

504001–504100 

|-bgcolor=#E9E9E9
| 504001 ||  || — || December 18, 2004 || Socorro || LINEAR ||  || align=right | 3.0 km || 
|-id=002 bgcolor=#E9E9E9
| 504002 ||  || — || December 11, 2004 || Kitt Peak || Spacewatch ||  || align=right | 2.5 km || 
|-id=003 bgcolor=#E9E9E9
| 504003 ||  || — || January 15, 2005 || Kitt Peak || Spacewatch ||  || align=right | 2.1 km || 
|-id=004 bgcolor=#E9E9E9
| 504004 ||  || — || January 16, 2005 || Socorro || LINEAR ||  || align=right | 3.0 km || 
|-id=005 bgcolor=#E9E9E9
| 504005 ||  || — || February 1, 2005 || Kitt Peak || Spacewatch ||  || align=right | 1.8 km || 
|-id=006 bgcolor=#fefefe
| 504006 ||  || — || March 4, 2005 || Mount Lemmon || Mount Lemmon Survey ||  || align=right data-sort-value="0.82" | 820 m || 
|-id=007 bgcolor=#fefefe
| 504007 ||  || — || September 27, 2003 || Socorro || LINEAR || H || align=right data-sort-value="0.78" | 780 m || 
|-id=008 bgcolor=#fefefe
| 504008 ||  || — || March 16, 2005 || Catalina || CSS || H || align=right data-sort-value="0.59" | 590 m || 
|-id=009 bgcolor=#fefefe
| 504009 ||  || — || March 30, 2005 || Catalina || CSS ||  || align=right | 1.0 km || 
|-id=010 bgcolor=#d6d6d6
| 504010 ||  || — || April 6, 2005 || Mount Lemmon || Mount Lemmon Survey ||  || align=right | 2.0 km || 
|-id=011 bgcolor=#fefefe
| 504011 ||  || — || April 10, 2005 || Kitt Peak || Spacewatch ||  || align=right data-sort-value="0.63" | 630 m || 
|-id=012 bgcolor=#FA8072
| 504012 ||  || — || May 9, 2005 || Siding Spring || SSS || unusual || align=right | 2.8 km || 
|-id=013 bgcolor=#fefefe
| 504013 ||  || — || May 10, 2005 || Mount Lemmon || Mount Lemmon Survey ||  || align=right data-sort-value="0.71" | 710 m || 
|-id=014 bgcolor=#fefefe
| 504014 ||  || — || April 11, 2005 || Mount Lemmon || Mount Lemmon Survey ||  || align=right data-sort-value="0.83" | 830 m || 
|-id=015 bgcolor=#d6d6d6
| 504015 ||  || — || May 11, 2005 || Kitt Peak || Spacewatch ||  || align=right | 3.1 km || 
|-id=016 bgcolor=#fefefe
| 504016 ||  || — || May 3, 2005 || Kitt Peak || Spacewatch || H || align=right data-sort-value="0.67" | 670 m || 
|-id=017 bgcolor=#d6d6d6
| 504017 ||  || — || April 17, 2005 || Kitt Peak || Spacewatch || EOS || align=right | 1.7 km || 
|-id=018 bgcolor=#fefefe
| 504018 ||  || — || June 29, 2005 || Kitt Peak || Spacewatch ||  || align=right data-sort-value="0.83" | 830 m || 
|-id=019 bgcolor=#d6d6d6
| 504019 ||  || — || June 29, 2005 || Kitt Peak || Spacewatch ||  || align=right | 2.7 km || 
|-id=020 bgcolor=#d6d6d6
| 504020 ||  || — || July 4, 2005 || Kitt Peak || Spacewatch ||  || align=right | 2.9 km || 
|-id=021 bgcolor=#d6d6d6
| 504021 ||  || — || July 5, 2005 || Mount Lemmon || Mount Lemmon Survey ||  || align=right | 3.1 km || 
|-id=022 bgcolor=#d6d6d6
| 504022 ||  || — || July 9, 2005 || Kitt Peak || Spacewatch || LIX || align=right | 3.4 km || 
|-id=023 bgcolor=#d6d6d6
| 504023 ||  || — || August 28, 2005 || Kitt Peak || Spacewatch || VER || align=right | 2.2 km || 
|-id=024 bgcolor=#FA8072
| 504024 ||  || — || August 30, 2005 || Kitt Peak || Spacewatch ||  || align=right data-sort-value="0.52" | 520 m || 
|-id=025 bgcolor=#FFC2E0
| 504025 ||  || — || September 8, 2005 || Siding Spring || SSS || AMO || align=right data-sort-value="0.58" | 580 m || 
|-id=026 bgcolor=#d6d6d6
| 504026 ||  || — || September 29, 2005 || Mount Lemmon || Mount Lemmon Survey ||  || align=right | 2.1 km || 
|-id=027 bgcolor=#fefefe
| 504027 ||  || — || September 30, 2005 || Mount Lemmon || Mount Lemmon Survey || critical || align=right data-sort-value="0.31" | 310 m || 
|-id=028 bgcolor=#d6d6d6
| 504028 ||  || — || August 31, 2005 || Kitt Peak || Spacewatch ||  || align=right | 2.6 km || 
|-id=029 bgcolor=#E9E9E9
| 504029 ||  || — || October 7, 2005 || Kitt Peak || Spacewatch ||  || align=right data-sort-value="0.64" | 640 m || 
|-id=030 bgcolor=#E9E9E9
| 504030 ||  || — || October 1, 2005 || Kitt Peak || Spacewatch ||  || align=right data-sort-value="0.56" | 560 m || 
|-id=031 bgcolor=#E9E9E9
| 504031 ||  || — || October 26, 2005 || Kitt Peak || Spacewatch ||  || align=right data-sort-value="0.59" | 590 m || 
|-id=032 bgcolor=#E9E9E9
| 504032 ||  || — || October 26, 2005 || Kitt Peak || Spacewatch ||  || align=right data-sort-value="0.72" | 720 m || 
|-id=033 bgcolor=#FFC2E0
| 504033 ||  || — || October 29, 2005 || Mount Lemmon || Mount Lemmon Survey || APO +1km || align=right data-sort-value="0.79" | 790 m || 
|-id=034 bgcolor=#FFC2E0
| 504034 ||  || — || October 30, 2005 || Palomar || NEAT || APO +1kmPHA || align=right | 1.1 km || 
|-id=035 bgcolor=#E9E9E9
| 504035 ||  || — || October 27, 2005 || Mount Lemmon || Mount Lemmon Survey ||  || align=right data-sort-value="0.62" | 620 m || 
|-id=036 bgcolor=#E9E9E9
| 504036 ||  || — || October 25, 2005 || Mount Lemmon || Mount Lemmon Survey ||  || align=right data-sort-value="0.60" | 600 m || 
|-id=037 bgcolor=#E9E9E9
| 504037 ||  || — || October 25, 2005 || Kitt Peak || Spacewatch ||  || align=right data-sort-value="0.63" | 630 m || 
|-id=038 bgcolor=#E9E9E9
| 504038 ||  || — || October 25, 2005 || Kitt Peak || Spacewatch || EUN || align=right data-sort-value="0.75" | 750 m || 
|-id=039 bgcolor=#E9E9E9
| 504039 ||  || — || October 26, 2005 || Kitt Peak || Spacewatch ||  || align=right data-sort-value="0.54" | 540 m || 
|-id=040 bgcolor=#E9E9E9
| 504040 ||  || — || October 28, 2005 || Mount Lemmon || Mount Lemmon Survey ||  || align=right data-sort-value="0.63" | 630 m || 
|-id=041 bgcolor=#E9E9E9
| 504041 ||  || — || October 29, 2005 || Mount Lemmon || Mount Lemmon Survey || MAR || align=right data-sort-value="0.78" | 780 m || 
|-id=042 bgcolor=#E9E9E9
| 504042 ||  || — || October 25, 2005 || Kitt Peak || Spacewatch ||  || align=right data-sort-value="0.45" | 450 m || 
|-id=043 bgcolor=#E9E9E9
| 504043 ||  || — || November 1, 2005 || Kitt Peak || Spacewatch ||  || align=right data-sort-value="0.55" | 550 m || 
|-id=044 bgcolor=#d6d6d6
| 504044 ||  || — || October 25, 2005 || Kitt Peak || Spacewatch || 7:4 || align=right | 3.9 km || 
|-id=045 bgcolor=#fefefe
| 504045 ||  || — || October 27, 2005 || Mount Lemmon || Mount Lemmon Survey ||  || align=right data-sort-value="0.60" | 600 m || 
|-id=046 bgcolor=#d6d6d6
| 504046 ||  || — || September 29, 2005 || Mount Lemmon || Mount Lemmon Survey ||  || align=right | 2.3 km || 
|-id=047 bgcolor=#E9E9E9
| 504047 ||  || — || November 21, 2005 || Kitt Peak || Spacewatch ||  || align=right | 1.5 km || 
|-id=048 bgcolor=#E9E9E9
| 504048 ||  || — || November 21, 2005 || Kitt Peak || Spacewatch ||  || align=right data-sort-value="0.73" | 730 m || 
|-id=049 bgcolor=#E9E9E9
| 504049 ||  || — || November 25, 2005 || Mount Lemmon || Mount Lemmon Survey ||  || align=right data-sort-value="0.72" | 720 m || 
|-id=050 bgcolor=#E9E9E9
| 504050 ||  || — || November 26, 2005 || Kitt Peak || Spacewatch ||  || align=right data-sort-value="0.69" | 690 m || 
|-id=051 bgcolor=#E9E9E9
| 504051 ||  || — || November 25, 2005 || Mount Lemmon || Mount Lemmon Survey ||  || align=right data-sort-value="0.67" | 670 m || 
|-id=052 bgcolor=#E9E9E9
| 504052 ||  || — || November 26, 2005 || Kitt Peak || Spacewatch ||  || align=right data-sort-value="0.89" | 890 m || 
|-id=053 bgcolor=#E9E9E9
| 504053 ||  || — || December 4, 2005 || Kitt Peak || Spacewatch || EUN || align=right data-sort-value="0.83" | 830 m || 
|-id=054 bgcolor=#E9E9E9
| 504054 ||  || — || December 1, 2005 || Kitt Peak || Spacewatch ||  || align=right data-sort-value="0.64" | 640 m || 
|-id=055 bgcolor=#E9E9E9
| 504055 ||  || — || December 2, 2005 || Kitt Peak || Spacewatch ||  || align=right data-sort-value="0.60" | 600 m || 
|-id=056 bgcolor=#E9E9E9
| 504056 ||  || — || December 6, 2005 || Kitt Peak || Spacewatch ||  || align=right | 1.4 km || 
|-id=057 bgcolor=#E9E9E9
| 504057 ||  || — || December 6, 2005 || Mount Lemmon || Mount Lemmon Survey ||  || align=right | 1.3 km || 
|-id=058 bgcolor=#E9E9E9
| 504058 ||  || — || December 24, 2005 || Kitt Peak || Spacewatch ||  || align=right data-sort-value="0.41" | 410 m || 
|-id=059 bgcolor=#E9E9E9
| 504059 ||  || — || November 30, 2005 || Mount Lemmon || Mount Lemmon Survey ||  || align=right data-sort-value="0.76" | 760 m || 
|-id=060 bgcolor=#E9E9E9
| 504060 ||  || — || December 2, 2005 || Mount Lemmon || Mount Lemmon Survey ||  || align=right | 2.0 km || 
|-id=061 bgcolor=#E9E9E9
| 504061 ||  || — || December 24, 2005 || Kitt Peak || Spacewatch ||  || align=right | 1.5 km || 
|-id=062 bgcolor=#E9E9E9
| 504062 ||  || — || December 25, 2005 || Mount Lemmon || Mount Lemmon Survey ||  || align=right data-sort-value="0.76" | 760 m || 
|-id=063 bgcolor=#E9E9E9
| 504063 ||  || — || December 27, 2005 || Mount Lemmon || Mount Lemmon Survey ||  || align=right data-sort-value="0.70" | 700 m || 
|-id=064 bgcolor=#E9E9E9
| 504064 ||  || — || December 27, 2005 || Kitt Peak || Spacewatch ||  || align=right | 1.7 km || 
|-id=065 bgcolor=#E9E9E9
| 504065 ||  || — || December 26, 2005 || Mount Lemmon || Mount Lemmon Survey ||  || align=right data-sort-value="0.67" | 670 m || 
|-id=066 bgcolor=#E9E9E9
| 504066 ||  || — || October 1, 2005 || Mount Lemmon || Mount Lemmon Survey ||  || align=right | 1.3 km || 
|-id=067 bgcolor=#E9E9E9
| 504067 ||  || — || December 22, 2005 || Kitt Peak || Spacewatch || KON || align=right | 2.0 km || 
|-id=068 bgcolor=#E9E9E9
| 504068 ||  || — || December 22, 2005 || Kitt Peak || Spacewatch ||  || align=right | 1.2 km || 
|-id=069 bgcolor=#E9E9E9
| 504069 ||  || — || December 25, 2005 || Mount Lemmon || Mount Lemmon Survey || ADE || align=right | 2.1 km || 
|-id=070 bgcolor=#E9E9E9
| 504070 ||  || — || December 27, 2005 || Mount Lemmon || Mount Lemmon Survey ||  || align=right | 2.3 km || 
|-id=071 bgcolor=#E9E9E9
| 504071 ||  || — || December 29, 2005 || Mount Lemmon || Mount Lemmon Survey ||  || align=right data-sort-value="0.86" | 860 m || 
|-id=072 bgcolor=#E9E9E9
| 504072 ||  || — || December 29, 2005 || Kitt Peak || Spacewatch ||  || align=right data-sort-value="0.86" | 860 m || 
|-id=073 bgcolor=#E9E9E9
| 504073 ||  || — || December 6, 2005 || Mount Lemmon || Mount Lemmon Survey ||  || align=right data-sort-value="0.86" | 860 m || 
|-id=074 bgcolor=#FFC2E0
| 504074 ||  || — || January 1, 2006 || Siding Spring || SSS || APO +1km || align=right | 1.6 km || 
|-id=075 bgcolor=#E9E9E9
| 504075 ||  || — || December 26, 2005 || Mount Lemmon || Mount Lemmon Survey || EUN || align=right | 1.0 km || 
|-id=076 bgcolor=#E9E9E9
| 504076 ||  || — || January 22, 2006 || Mount Lemmon || Mount Lemmon Survey ||  || align=right | 1.2 km || 
|-id=077 bgcolor=#d6d6d6
| 504077 ||  || — || January 23, 2006 || Mount Lemmon || Mount Lemmon Survey ||  || align=right | 3.1 km || 
|-id=078 bgcolor=#E9E9E9
| 504078 ||  || — || January 23, 2006 || Kitt Peak || Spacewatch ||  || align=right | 1.2 km || 
|-id=079 bgcolor=#E9E9E9
| 504079 ||  || — || January 23, 2006 || Kitt Peak || Spacewatch ||  || align=right data-sort-value="0.94" | 940 m || 
|-id=080 bgcolor=#fefefe
| 504080 ||  || — || December 27, 2005 || Mount Lemmon || Mount Lemmon Survey || H || align=right data-sort-value="0.78" | 780 m || 
|-id=081 bgcolor=#E9E9E9
| 504081 ||  || — || January 25, 2006 || Kitt Peak || Spacewatch ||  || align=right | 1.2 km || 
|-id=082 bgcolor=#E9E9E9
| 504082 ||  || — || January 5, 2006 || Anderson Mesa || LONEOS ||  || align=right | 1.8 km || 
|-id=083 bgcolor=#E9E9E9
| 504083 ||  || — || January 28, 2006 || Mount Lemmon || Mount Lemmon Survey ||  || align=right data-sort-value="0.83" | 830 m || 
|-id=084 bgcolor=#E9E9E9
| 504084 ||  || — || January 27, 2006 || Mount Lemmon || Mount Lemmon Survey ||  || align=right | 1.5 km || 
|-id=085 bgcolor=#E9E9E9
| 504085 ||  || — || January 30, 2006 || Kitt Peak || Spacewatch ||  || align=right | 2.7 km || 
|-id=086 bgcolor=#E9E9E9
| 504086 ||  || — || January 23, 2006 || Kitt Peak || Spacewatch || EUN || align=right | 1.3 km || 
|-id=087 bgcolor=#E9E9E9
| 504087 ||  || — || January 23, 2006 || Mount Lemmon || Mount Lemmon Survey ||  || align=right | 2.3 km || 
|-id=088 bgcolor=#E9E9E9
| 504088 ||  || — || February 1, 2006 || Kitt Peak || Spacewatch ||  || align=right | 2.1 km || 
|-id=089 bgcolor=#fefefe
| 504089 ||  || — || January 20, 2006 || Kitt Peak || Spacewatch ||  || align=right data-sort-value="0.71" | 710 m || 
|-id=090 bgcolor=#FA8072
| 504090 ||  || — || February 20, 2006 || Kitt Peak || Spacewatch ||  || align=right data-sort-value="0.72" | 720 m || 
|-id=091 bgcolor=#E9E9E9
| 504091 ||  || — || February 7, 2006 || Mount Lemmon || Mount Lemmon Survey ||  || align=right | 1.4 km || 
|-id=092 bgcolor=#E9E9E9
| 504092 ||  || — || February 20, 2006 || Kitt Peak || Spacewatch || MRX || align=right data-sort-value="0.97" | 970 m || 
|-id=093 bgcolor=#E9E9E9
| 504093 ||  || — || February 20, 2006 || Kitt Peak || Spacewatch ||  || align=right | 2.0 km || 
|-id=094 bgcolor=#E9E9E9
| 504094 ||  || — || February 6, 2006 || Mount Lemmon || Mount Lemmon Survey ||  || align=right | 1.2 km || 
|-id=095 bgcolor=#E9E9E9
| 504095 ||  || — || February 24, 2006 || Kitt Peak || Spacewatch ||  || align=right | 1.3 km || 
|-id=096 bgcolor=#fefefe
| 504096 ||  || — || February 25, 2006 || Kitt Peak || Spacewatch ||  || align=right data-sort-value="0.67" | 670 m || 
|-id=097 bgcolor=#fefefe
| 504097 ||  || — || February 25, 2006 || Kitt Peak || Spacewatch ||  || align=right data-sort-value="0.62" | 620 m || 
|-id=098 bgcolor=#E9E9E9
| 504098 ||  || — || February 25, 2006 || Kitt Peak || Spacewatch ||  || align=right | 1.9 km || 
|-id=099 bgcolor=#E9E9E9
| 504099 ||  || — || February 27, 2006 || Kitt Peak || Spacewatch ||  || align=right | 2.6 km || 
|-id=100 bgcolor=#E9E9E9
| 504100 ||  || — || January 23, 2006 || Catalina || CSS ||  || align=right | 1.9 km || 
|}

504101–504200 

|-bgcolor=#fefefe
| 504101 ||  || — || February 25, 2006 || Kitt Peak || Spacewatch ||  || align=right data-sort-value="0.54" | 540 m || 
|-id=102 bgcolor=#E9E9E9
| 504102 ||  || — || February 25, 2006 || Kitt Peak || Spacewatch ||  || align=right | 1.1 km || 
|-id=103 bgcolor=#E9E9E9
| 504103 ||  || — || March 4, 2006 || Kitt Peak || Spacewatch ||  || align=right | 1.5 km || 
|-id=104 bgcolor=#E9E9E9
| 504104 ||  || — || March 23, 2006 || Kitt Peak || Spacewatch ||  || align=right | 1.6 km || 
|-id=105 bgcolor=#E9E9E9
| 504105 ||  || — || March 5, 2006 || Socorro || LINEAR ||  || align=right | 2.6 km || 
|-id=106 bgcolor=#E9E9E9
| 504106 ||  || — || April 2, 2006 || Kitt Peak || Spacewatch ||  || align=right | 1.5 km || 
|-id=107 bgcolor=#E9E9E9
| 504107 ||  || — || April 20, 2006 || Kitt Peak || Spacewatch || BAR || align=right data-sort-value="0.92" | 920 m || 
|-id=108 bgcolor=#fefefe
| 504108 ||  || — || April 26, 2006 || Kitt Peak || Spacewatch ||  || align=right data-sort-value="0.57" | 570 m || 
|-id=109 bgcolor=#E9E9E9
| 504109 ||  || — || April 30, 2006 || Kitt Peak || Spacewatch ||  || align=right | 2.1 km || 
|-id=110 bgcolor=#E9E9E9
| 504110 ||  || — || April 26, 2006 || Cerro Tololo || M. W. Buie || AGN || align=right data-sort-value="0.82" | 820 m || 
|-id=111 bgcolor=#fefefe
| 504111 ||  || — || May 19, 2006 || Mount Lemmon || Mount Lemmon Survey ||  || align=right data-sort-value="0.66" | 660 m || 
|-id=112 bgcolor=#fefefe
| 504112 ||  || — || May 21, 2006 || Kitt Peak || Spacewatch ||  || align=right data-sort-value="0.52" | 520 m || 
|-id=113 bgcolor=#E9E9E9
| 504113 ||  || — || May 8, 2006 || Kitt Peak || Spacewatch ||  || align=right | 1.8 km || 
|-id=114 bgcolor=#d6d6d6
| 504114 ||  || — || June 20, 2006 || Kitt Peak || Spacewatch ||  || align=right | 2.3 km || 
|-id=115 bgcolor=#fefefe
| 504115 ||  || — || July 25, 2006 || Mount Lemmon || Mount Lemmon Survey ||  || align=right data-sort-value="0.70" | 700 m || 
|-id=116 bgcolor=#E9E9E9
| 504116 ||  || — || August 19, 2006 || Anderson Mesa || LONEOS ||  || align=right | 1.7 km || 
|-id=117 bgcolor=#fefefe
| 504117 ||  || — || August 18, 2006 || Kitt Peak || Spacewatch ||  || align=right data-sort-value="0.79" | 790 m || 
|-id=118 bgcolor=#d6d6d6
| 504118 ||  || — || August 19, 2006 || Kitt Peak || Spacewatch ||  || align=right | 2.4 km || 
|-id=119 bgcolor=#fefefe
| 504119 ||  || — || September 14, 2006 || Kitt Peak || Spacewatch ||  || align=right data-sort-value="0.62" | 620 m || 
|-id=120 bgcolor=#d6d6d6
| 504120 ||  || — || September 14, 2006 || Kitt Peak || Spacewatch || EOS || align=right | 1.5 km || 
|-id=121 bgcolor=#d6d6d6
| 504121 ||  || — || September 14, 2006 || Kitt Peak || Spacewatch ||  || align=right | 3.0 km || 
|-id=122 bgcolor=#d6d6d6
| 504122 ||  || — || September 14, 2006 || Kitt Peak || Spacewatch ||  || align=right | 2.1 km || 
|-id=123 bgcolor=#d6d6d6
| 504123 ||  || — || September 14, 2006 || Kitt Peak || Spacewatch ||  || align=right | 3.1 km || 
|-id=124 bgcolor=#fefefe
| 504124 ||  || — || September 14, 2006 || Kitt Peak || Spacewatch ||  || align=right data-sort-value="0.64" | 640 m || 
|-id=125 bgcolor=#fefefe
| 504125 ||  || — || September 15, 2006 || Kitt Peak || Spacewatch || MAS || align=right data-sort-value="0.47" | 470 m || 
|-id=126 bgcolor=#d6d6d6
| 504126 ||  || — || September 15, 2006 || Kitt Peak || Spacewatch ||  || align=right | 2.3 km || 
|-id=127 bgcolor=#fefefe
| 504127 ||  || — || September 15, 2006 || Kitt Peak || Spacewatch ||  || align=right data-sort-value="0.62" | 620 m || 
|-id=128 bgcolor=#d6d6d6
| 504128 ||  || — || September 15, 2006 || Kitt Peak || Spacewatch || EOS || align=right | 1.3 km || 
|-id=129 bgcolor=#fefefe
| 504129 ||  || — || September 15, 2006 || Kitt Peak || Spacewatch ||  || align=right data-sort-value="0.61" | 610 m || 
|-id=130 bgcolor=#d6d6d6
| 504130 ||  || — || September 15, 2006 || Kitt Peak || Spacewatch ||  || align=right | 2.0 km || 
|-id=131 bgcolor=#fefefe
| 504131 ||  || — || September 15, 2006 || Kitt Peak || Spacewatch ||  || align=right data-sort-value="0.67" | 670 m || 
|-id=132 bgcolor=#d6d6d6
| 504132 ||  || — || September 15, 2006 || Kitt Peak || Spacewatch ||  || align=right | 2.3 km || 
|-id=133 bgcolor=#d6d6d6
| 504133 ||  || — || September 15, 2006 || Kitt Peak || Spacewatch ||  || align=right | 2.9 km || 
|-id=134 bgcolor=#d6d6d6
| 504134 ||  || — || September 15, 2006 || Kitt Peak || Spacewatch || URS || align=right | 3.3 km || 
|-id=135 bgcolor=#d6d6d6
| 504135 ||  || — || September 14, 2006 || Mauna Kea || J. Masiero ||  || align=right | 2.0 km || 
|-id=136 bgcolor=#d6d6d6
| 504136 ||  || — || September 15, 2006 || Kitt Peak || Spacewatch ||  || align=right | 2.8 km || 
|-id=137 bgcolor=#fefefe
| 504137 ||  || — || September 17, 2006 || Catalina || CSS ||  || align=right data-sort-value="0.71" | 710 m || 
|-id=138 bgcolor=#fefefe
| 504138 ||  || — || September 16, 2006 || Catalina || CSS ||  || align=right data-sort-value="0.69" | 690 m || 
|-id=139 bgcolor=#d6d6d6
| 504139 ||  || — || September 18, 2006 || Kitt Peak || Spacewatch ||  || align=right | 2.3 km || 
|-id=140 bgcolor=#d6d6d6
| 504140 ||  || — || September 18, 2006 || Catalina || CSS || EMA || align=right | 3.8 km || 
|-id=141 bgcolor=#fefefe
| 504141 ||  || — || September 19, 2006 || Kitt Peak || Spacewatch ||  || align=right data-sort-value="0.59" | 590 m || 
|-id=142 bgcolor=#d6d6d6
| 504142 ||  || — || September 18, 2006 || Kitt Peak || Spacewatch || THM || align=right | 2.2 km || 
|-id=143 bgcolor=#fefefe
| 504143 ||  || — || August 28, 2006 || Catalina || CSS || NYS || align=right data-sort-value="0.52" | 520 m || 
|-id=144 bgcolor=#fefefe
| 504144 ||  || — || March 3, 2005 || Kitt Peak || Spacewatch || H || align=right data-sort-value="0.67" | 670 m || 
|-id=145 bgcolor=#d6d6d6
| 504145 ||  || — || September 19, 2006 || Kitt Peak || Spacewatch || EOS || align=right | 1.5 km || 
|-id=146 bgcolor=#fefefe
| 504146 ||  || — || September 19, 2006 || Kitt Peak || Spacewatch ||  || align=right data-sort-value="0.59" | 590 m || 
|-id=147 bgcolor=#fefefe
| 504147 ||  || — || September 15, 2006 || Kitt Peak || Spacewatch ||  || align=right data-sort-value="0.61" | 610 m || 
|-id=148 bgcolor=#fefefe
| 504148 ||  || — || September 15, 2006 || Kitt Peak || Spacewatch ||  || align=right data-sort-value="0.66" | 660 m || 
|-id=149 bgcolor=#d6d6d6
| 504149 ||  || — || September 25, 2006 || Mount Lemmon || Mount Lemmon Survey ||  || align=right | 2.0 km || 
|-id=150 bgcolor=#fefefe
| 504150 ||  || — || September 18, 2006 || Kitt Peak || Spacewatch || NYS || align=right data-sort-value="0.52" | 520 m || 
|-id=151 bgcolor=#d6d6d6
| 504151 ||  || — || August 28, 2006 || Kitt Peak || Spacewatch ||  || align=right | 2.2 km || 
|-id=152 bgcolor=#d6d6d6
| 504152 ||  || — || September 26, 2006 || Kitt Peak || Spacewatch ||  || align=right | 2.3 km || 
|-id=153 bgcolor=#d6d6d6
| 504153 ||  || — || September 26, 2006 || Mount Lemmon || Mount Lemmon Survey ||  || align=right | 1.7 km || 
|-id=154 bgcolor=#d6d6d6
| 504154 ||  || — || September 15, 2006 || Kitt Peak || Spacewatch ||  || align=right | 2.9 km || 
|-id=155 bgcolor=#d6d6d6
| 504155 ||  || — || September 26, 2006 || Kitt Peak || Spacewatch || EOS || align=right | 1.5 km || 
|-id=156 bgcolor=#d6d6d6
| 504156 ||  || — || September 26, 2006 || Kitt Peak || Spacewatch ||  || align=right | 2.4 km || 
|-id=157 bgcolor=#d6d6d6
| 504157 ||  || — || September 28, 2006 || Kitt Peak || Spacewatch ||  || align=right | 2.7 km || 
|-id=158 bgcolor=#fefefe
| 504158 ||  || — || September 25, 2006 || Kitt Peak || Spacewatch ||  || align=right data-sort-value="0.54" | 540 m || 
|-id=159 bgcolor=#fefefe
| 504159 ||  || — || September 17, 2006 || Kitt Peak || Spacewatch || MAS || align=right data-sort-value="0.53" | 530 m || 
|-id=160 bgcolor=#B88A00
| 504160 ||  || — || September 26, 2006 || Kitt Peak || Spacewatch || unusual || align=right | 6.9 km || 
|-id=161 bgcolor=#fefefe
| 504161 ||  || — || September 18, 2006 || Kitt Peak || Spacewatch ||  || align=right data-sort-value="0.55" | 550 m || 
|-id=162 bgcolor=#fefefe
| 504162 ||  || — || September 17, 2006 || Kitt Peak || Spacewatch || NYS || align=right data-sort-value="0.50" | 500 m || 
|-id=163 bgcolor=#fefefe
| 504163 ||  || — || September 17, 2006 || Kitt Peak || Spacewatch || MAS || align=right data-sort-value="0.63" | 630 m || 
|-id=164 bgcolor=#d6d6d6
| 504164 ||  || — || September 19, 2006 || Kitt Peak || Spacewatch ||  || align=right | 2.6 km || 
|-id=165 bgcolor=#fefefe
| 504165 ||  || — || September 14, 2006 || Kitt Peak || Spacewatch || H || align=right data-sort-value="0.68" | 680 m || 
|-id=166 bgcolor=#d6d6d6
| 504166 ||  || — || September 30, 2006 || Mount Lemmon || Mount Lemmon Survey || THM || align=right | 2.2 km || 
|-id=167 bgcolor=#fefefe
| 504167 ||  || — || September 30, 2006 || Catalina || CSS || NYS || align=right data-sort-value="0.55" | 550 m || 
|-id=168 bgcolor=#fefefe
| 504168 ||  || — || September 30, 2006 || Mount Lemmon || Mount Lemmon Survey ||  || align=right data-sort-value="0.69" | 690 m || 
|-id=169 bgcolor=#fefefe
| 504169 ||  || — || September 30, 2006 || Mount Lemmon || Mount Lemmon Survey || H || align=right data-sort-value="0.68" | 680 m || 
|-id=170 bgcolor=#d6d6d6
| 504170 ||  || — || September 15, 2006 || Kitt Peak || Spacewatch ||  || align=right | 1.9 km || 
|-id=171 bgcolor=#d6d6d6
| 504171 ||  || — || September 16, 2006 || Kitt Peak || Spacewatch || THM || align=right | 2.0 km || 
|-id=172 bgcolor=#d6d6d6
| 504172 ||  || — || September 27, 2006 || Apache Point || A. C. Becker ||  || align=right | 2.4 km || 
|-id=173 bgcolor=#d6d6d6
| 504173 ||  || — || September 30, 2006 || Apache Point || A. C. Becker ||  || align=right | 2.1 km || 
|-id=174 bgcolor=#E9E9E9
| 504174 ||  || — || September 17, 2006 || Catalina || CSS ||  || align=right | 1.5 km || 
|-id=175 bgcolor=#d6d6d6
| 504175 ||  || — || September 25, 2006 || Kitt Peak || Spacewatch ||  || align=right | 1.8 km || 
|-id=176 bgcolor=#d6d6d6
| 504176 ||  || — || September 27, 2006 || Mount Lemmon || Mount Lemmon Survey || THM || align=right | 2.0 km || 
|-id=177 bgcolor=#fefefe
| 504177 ||  || — || September 25, 2006 || Mount Lemmon || Mount Lemmon Survey ||  || align=right data-sort-value="0.67" | 670 m || 
|-id=178 bgcolor=#d6d6d6
| 504178 ||  || — || September 26, 2006 || Mount Lemmon || Mount Lemmon Survey ||  || align=right | 2.0 km || 
|-id=179 bgcolor=#d6d6d6
| 504179 ||  || — || September 27, 2006 || Mount Lemmon || Mount Lemmon Survey ||  || align=right | 2.2 km || 
|-id=180 bgcolor=#d6d6d6
| 504180 ||  || — || September 28, 2006 || Catalina || CSS ||  || align=right | 3.6 km || 
|-id=181 bgcolor=#FFC2E0
| 504181 ||  || — || October 1, 2006 || Siding Spring || SSS || APO || align=right data-sort-value="0.65" | 650 m || 
|-id=182 bgcolor=#fefefe
| 504182 ||  || — || October 2, 2006 || Mount Lemmon || Mount Lemmon Survey || H || align=right data-sort-value="0.58" | 580 m || 
|-id=183 bgcolor=#fefefe
| 504183 ||  || — || September 17, 2006 || Kitt Peak || Spacewatch ||  || align=right data-sort-value="0.83" | 830 m || 
|-id=184 bgcolor=#fefefe
| 504184 ||  || — || September 25, 2006 || Mount Lemmon || Mount Lemmon Survey ||  || align=right data-sort-value="0.65" | 650 m || 
|-id=185 bgcolor=#d6d6d6
| 504185 ||  || — || October 12, 2006 || Kitt Peak || Spacewatch || THM || align=right | 2.2 km || 
|-id=186 bgcolor=#d6d6d6
| 504186 ||  || — || September 30, 2006 || Mount Lemmon || Mount Lemmon Survey ||  || align=right | 3.1 km || 
|-id=187 bgcolor=#d6d6d6
| 504187 ||  || — || September 26, 2006 || Mount Lemmon || Mount Lemmon Survey ||  || align=right | 3.2 km || 
|-id=188 bgcolor=#d6d6d6
| 504188 ||  || — || October 12, 2006 || Kitt Peak || Spacewatch ||  || align=right | 2.6 km || 
|-id=189 bgcolor=#d6d6d6
| 504189 ||  || — || October 12, 2006 || Kitt Peak || Spacewatch ||  || align=right | 2.5 km || 
|-id=190 bgcolor=#d6d6d6
| 504190 ||  || — || October 12, 2006 || Kitt Peak || Spacewatch ||  || align=right | 2.5 km || 
|-id=191 bgcolor=#d6d6d6
| 504191 ||  || — || October 12, 2006 || Kitt Peak || Spacewatch ||  || align=right | 2.7 km || 
|-id=192 bgcolor=#fefefe
| 504192 ||  || — || September 26, 2006 || Mount Lemmon || Mount Lemmon Survey || NYS || align=right data-sort-value="0.39" | 390 m || 
|-id=193 bgcolor=#d6d6d6
| 504193 ||  || — || October 15, 2006 || Kitt Peak || Spacewatch ||  || align=right | 2.2 km || 
|-id=194 bgcolor=#d6d6d6
| 504194 ||  || — || October 13, 2006 || Kitt Peak || Spacewatch ||  || align=right | 2.3 km || 
|-id=195 bgcolor=#d6d6d6
| 504195 ||  || — || October 13, 2006 || Kitt Peak || Spacewatch || EOS || align=right | 1.9 km || 
|-id=196 bgcolor=#fefefe
| 504196 ||  || — || October 13, 2006 || Kitt Peak || Spacewatch ||  || align=right data-sort-value="0.57" | 570 m || 
|-id=197 bgcolor=#d6d6d6
| 504197 ||  || — || September 18, 2006 || Kitt Peak || Spacewatch || THM || align=right | 1.9 km || 
|-id=198 bgcolor=#d6d6d6
| 504198 ||  || — || September 30, 2006 || Mount Lemmon || Mount Lemmon Survey ||  || align=right | 2.3 km || 
|-id=199 bgcolor=#d6d6d6
| 504199 ||  || — || October 1, 2006 || Apache Point || A. C. Becker ||  || align=right | 3.3 km || 
|-id=200 bgcolor=#d6d6d6
| 504200 ||  || — || September 18, 2006 || Kitt Peak || Spacewatch || EOS || align=right | 1.3 km || 
|}

504201–504300 

|-bgcolor=#d6d6d6
| 504201 ||  || — || October 13, 2006 || Kitt Peak || Spacewatch ||  || align=right | 2.6 km || 
|-id=202 bgcolor=#d6d6d6
| 504202 ||  || — || October 4, 2006 || Mount Lemmon || Mount Lemmon Survey || HYG || align=right | 2.1 km || 
|-id=203 bgcolor=#d6d6d6
| 504203 ||  || — || October 3, 2006 || Mount Lemmon || Mount Lemmon Survey ||  || align=right | 2.6 km || 
|-id=204 bgcolor=#d6d6d6
| 504204 ||  || — || September 30, 2006 || Mount Lemmon || Mount Lemmon Survey ||  || align=right | 3.7 km || 
|-id=205 bgcolor=#fefefe
| 504205 ||  || — || October 16, 2006 || Kitt Peak || Spacewatch || V || align=right data-sort-value="0.51" | 510 m || 
|-id=206 bgcolor=#d6d6d6
| 504206 ||  || — || October 3, 2006 || Kitt Peak || Spacewatch ||  || align=right | 2.6 km || 
|-id=207 bgcolor=#fefefe
| 504207 ||  || — || September 27, 2006 || Mount Lemmon || Mount Lemmon Survey ||  || align=right data-sort-value="0.59" | 590 m || 
|-id=208 bgcolor=#d6d6d6
| 504208 ||  || — || October 12, 2006 || Kitt Peak || Spacewatch || THM || align=right | 1.7 km || 
|-id=209 bgcolor=#fefefe
| 504209 ||  || — || October 16, 2006 || Kitt Peak || Spacewatch || H || align=right data-sort-value="0.44" | 440 m || 
|-id=210 bgcolor=#fefefe
| 504210 ||  || — || October 16, 2006 || Kitt Peak || Spacewatch || NYS || align=right data-sort-value="0.42" | 420 m || 
|-id=211 bgcolor=#d6d6d6
| 504211 ||  || — || October 16, 2006 || Kitt Peak || Spacewatch ||  || align=right | 2.2 km || 
|-id=212 bgcolor=#fefefe
| 504212 ||  || — || October 16, 2006 || Kitt Peak || Spacewatch ||  || align=right data-sort-value="0.59" | 590 m || 
|-id=213 bgcolor=#d6d6d6
| 504213 ||  || — || October 17, 2006 || Mount Lemmon || Mount Lemmon Survey ||  || align=right | 1.9 km || 
|-id=214 bgcolor=#d6d6d6
| 504214 ||  || — || September 20, 2006 || Kitt Peak || Spacewatch ||  || align=right | 3.2 km || 
|-id=215 bgcolor=#fefefe
| 504215 ||  || — || September 28, 2006 || Catalina || CSS ||  || align=right data-sort-value="0.75" | 750 m || 
|-id=216 bgcolor=#d6d6d6
| 504216 ||  || — || June 15, 2005 || Kitt Peak || Spacewatch ||  || align=right | 2.4 km || 
|-id=217 bgcolor=#d6d6d6
| 504217 ||  || — || September 30, 2006 || Kitt Peak || Spacewatch ||  || align=right | 2.5 km || 
|-id=218 bgcolor=#d6d6d6
| 504218 ||  || — || October 17, 2006 || Kitt Peak || Spacewatch ||  || align=right | 2.6 km || 
|-id=219 bgcolor=#fefefe
| 504219 ||  || — || October 18, 2006 || Kitt Peak || Spacewatch ||  || align=right data-sort-value="0.57" | 570 m || 
|-id=220 bgcolor=#d6d6d6
| 504220 ||  || — || October 18, 2006 || Kitt Peak || Spacewatch ||  || align=right | 2.3 km || 
|-id=221 bgcolor=#fefefe
| 504221 ||  || — || October 18, 2006 || Kitt Peak || Spacewatch ||  || align=right data-sort-value="0.52" | 520 m || 
|-id=222 bgcolor=#fefefe
| 504222 ||  || — || September 30, 2006 || Mount Lemmon || Mount Lemmon Survey ||  || align=right data-sort-value="0.69" | 690 m || 
|-id=223 bgcolor=#d6d6d6
| 504223 ||  || — || September 24, 2006 || Kitt Peak || Spacewatch ||  || align=right | 2.4 km || 
|-id=224 bgcolor=#fefefe
| 504224 ||  || — || May 20, 2005 || Mount Lemmon || Mount Lemmon Survey ||  || align=right data-sort-value="0.71" | 710 m || 
|-id=225 bgcolor=#d6d6d6
| 504225 ||  || — || September 28, 2006 || Kitt Peak || Spacewatch ||  || align=right | 2.1 km || 
|-id=226 bgcolor=#d6d6d6
| 504226 ||  || — || October 19, 2006 || Kitt Peak || Spacewatch ||  || align=right | 3.7 km || 
|-id=227 bgcolor=#d6d6d6
| 504227 ||  || — || October 19, 2006 || Kitt Peak || Spacewatch || EOS || align=right | 1.6 km || 
|-id=228 bgcolor=#d6d6d6
| 504228 ||  || — || September 19, 2006 || Kitt Peak || Spacewatch ||  || align=right | 2.4 km || 
|-id=229 bgcolor=#d6d6d6
| 504229 ||  || — || October 16, 2006 || Catalina || CSS ||  || align=right | 2.9 km || 
|-id=230 bgcolor=#d6d6d6
| 504230 ||  || — || October 19, 2006 || Mount Lemmon || Mount Lemmon Survey ||  || align=right | 3.3 km || 
|-id=231 bgcolor=#d6d6d6
| 504231 ||  || — || October 20, 2006 || Kitt Peak || Spacewatch || THM || align=right | 1.9 km || 
|-id=232 bgcolor=#fefefe
| 504232 ||  || — || July 21, 2006 || Mount Lemmon || Mount Lemmon Survey ||  || align=right data-sort-value="0.70" | 700 m || 
|-id=233 bgcolor=#d6d6d6
| 504233 ||  || — || September 28, 2006 || Mount Lemmon || Mount Lemmon Survey ||  || align=right | 2.5 km || 
|-id=234 bgcolor=#d6d6d6
| 504234 ||  || — || October 19, 2006 || Mount Lemmon || Mount Lemmon Survey || LIX || align=right | 3.3 km || 
|-id=235 bgcolor=#fefefe
| 504235 ||  || — || October 21, 2006 || Kitt Peak || Spacewatch ||  || align=right data-sort-value="0.56" | 560 m || 
|-id=236 bgcolor=#d6d6d6
| 504236 ||  || — || September 18, 2006 || Kitt Peak || Spacewatch ||  || align=right | 1.9 km || 
|-id=237 bgcolor=#d6d6d6
| 504237 ||  || — || October 23, 2006 || Kitt Peak || Spacewatch ||  || align=right | 4.2 km || 
|-id=238 bgcolor=#d6d6d6
| 504238 ||  || — || October 27, 2006 || Mount Lemmon || Mount Lemmon Survey || THM || align=right | 1.8 km || 
|-id=239 bgcolor=#d6d6d6
| 504239 ||  || — || October 20, 2006 || Kitt Peak || Spacewatch ||  || align=right | 2.5 km || 
|-id=240 bgcolor=#fefefe
| 504240 ||  || — || October 27, 2006 || Mount Lemmon || Mount Lemmon Survey ||  || align=right data-sort-value="0.86" | 860 m || 
|-id=241 bgcolor=#d6d6d6
| 504241 ||  || — || October 28, 2006 || Kitt Peak || Spacewatch ||  || align=right | 2.2 km || 
|-id=242 bgcolor=#fefefe
| 504242 ||  || — || October 27, 2006 || Kitt Peak || Spacewatch ||  || align=right data-sort-value="0.75" | 750 m || 
|-id=243 bgcolor=#d6d6d6
| 504243 ||  || — || October 27, 2006 || Catalina || CSS || Tj (2.99) || align=right | 3.8 km || 
|-id=244 bgcolor=#d6d6d6
| 504244 ||  || — || September 30, 2006 || Mount Lemmon || Mount Lemmon Survey ||  || align=right | 3.0 km || 
|-id=245 bgcolor=#d6d6d6
| 504245 ||  || — || October 16, 2006 || Kitt Peak || Spacewatch || VER || align=right | 2.0 km || 
|-id=246 bgcolor=#fefefe
| 504246 ||  || — || October 28, 2006 || Mount Lemmon || Mount Lemmon Survey ||  || align=right data-sort-value="0.71" | 710 m || 
|-id=247 bgcolor=#d6d6d6
| 504247 ||  || — || October 13, 2006 || Kitt Peak || Spacewatch ||  || align=right | 1.9 km || 
|-id=248 bgcolor=#d6d6d6
| 504248 ||  || — || October 3, 2006 || Mount Lemmon || Mount Lemmon Survey ||  || align=right | 3.1 km || 
|-id=249 bgcolor=#d6d6d6
| 504249 ||  || — || September 14, 2006 || Kitt Peak || Spacewatch ||  || align=right | 1.9 km || 
|-id=250 bgcolor=#fefefe
| 504250 ||  || — || September 17, 2006 || Kitt Peak || Spacewatch ||  || align=right data-sort-value="0.66" | 660 m || 
|-id=251 bgcolor=#d6d6d6
| 504251 ||  || — || October 20, 2006 || Kitt Peak || Spacewatch ||  || align=right | 2.4 km || 
|-id=252 bgcolor=#d6d6d6
| 504252 ||  || — || October 20, 2006 || Mount Lemmon || Mount Lemmon Survey ||  || align=right | 4.2 km || 
|-id=253 bgcolor=#d6d6d6
| 504253 ||  || — || October 16, 2006 || Kitt Peak || Spacewatch ||  || align=right | 2.1 km || 
|-id=254 bgcolor=#fefefe
| 504254 ||  || — || October 19, 2006 || Catalina || CSS ||  || align=right data-sort-value="0.86" | 860 m || 
|-id=255 bgcolor=#fefefe
| 504255 ||  || — || October 12, 2006 || Kitt Peak || Spacewatch || MAS || align=right data-sort-value="0.57" | 570 m || 
|-id=256 bgcolor=#FFC2E0
| 504256 ||  || — || November 13, 2006 || Socorro || LINEAR || APOPHA || align=right data-sort-value="0.59" | 590 m || 
|-id=257 bgcolor=#fefefe
| 504257 ||  || — || October 21, 2006 || Kitt Peak || Spacewatch ||  || align=right data-sort-value="0.71" | 710 m || 
|-id=258 bgcolor=#d6d6d6
| 504258 ||  || — || September 28, 2006 || Mount Lemmon || Mount Lemmon Survey ||  || align=right | 3.4 km || 
|-id=259 bgcolor=#d6d6d6
| 504259 ||  || — || October 27, 2006 || Mount Lemmon || Mount Lemmon Survey || TIR || align=right | 1.9 km || 
|-id=260 bgcolor=#d6d6d6
| 504260 ||  || — || November 10, 2006 || Kitt Peak || Spacewatch || THB || align=right | 3.0 km || 
|-id=261 bgcolor=#fefefe
| 504261 ||  || — || November 11, 2006 || Kitt Peak || Spacewatch ||  || align=right data-sort-value="0.88" | 880 m || 
|-id=262 bgcolor=#d6d6d6
| 504262 ||  || — || November 11, 2006 || Kitt Peak || Spacewatch ||  || align=right | 1.9 km || 
|-id=263 bgcolor=#d6d6d6
| 504263 ||  || — || November 14, 2006 || Socorro || LINEAR || Tj (2.97) || align=right | 4.0 km || 
|-id=264 bgcolor=#d6d6d6
| 504264 ||  || — || November 1, 2006 || Mount Lemmon || Mount Lemmon Survey ||  || align=right | 3.3 km || 
|-id=265 bgcolor=#d6d6d6
| 504265 ||  || — || September 28, 2006 || Catalina || CSS ||  || align=right | 3.5 km || 
|-id=266 bgcolor=#fefefe
| 504266 ||  || — || September 28, 2006 || Mount Lemmon || Mount Lemmon Survey ||  || align=right data-sort-value="0.56" | 560 m || 
|-id=267 bgcolor=#d6d6d6
| 504267 ||  || — || October 21, 2006 || Kitt Peak || Spacewatch ||  || align=right | 2.5 km || 
|-id=268 bgcolor=#fefefe
| 504268 ||  || — || September 27, 2006 || Mount Lemmon || Mount Lemmon Survey ||  || align=right data-sort-value="0.60" | 600 m || 
|-id=269 bgcolor=#fefefe
| 504269 ||  || — || August 18, 2006 || Kitt Peak || Spacewatch ||  || align=right data-sort-value="0.74" | 740 m || 
|-id=270 bgcolor=#d6d6d6
| 504270 ||  || — || November 11, 2006 || Kitt Peak || Spacewatch ||  || align=right | 2.7 km || 
|-id=271 bgcolor=#d6d6d6
| 504271 ||  || — || September 27, 2006 || Mount Lemmon || Mount Lemmon Survey ||  || align=right | 3.3 km || 
|-id=272 bgcolor=#d6d6d6
| 504272 ||  || — || September 28, 2006 || Mount Lemmon || Mount Lemmon Survey ||  || align=right | 2.9 km || 
|-id=273 bgcolor=#fefefe
| 504273 ||  || — || November 16, 2006 || Kitt Peak || Spacewatch ||  || align=right data-sort-value="0.66" | 660 m || 
|-id=274 bgcolor=#d6d6d6
| 504274 ||  || — || November 16, 2006 || Mount Lemmon || Mount Lemmon Survey || LIX || align=right | 3.6 km || 
|-id=275 bgcolor=#fefefe
| 504275 ||  || — || November 17, 2006 || Kitt Peak || Spacewatch ||  || align=right data-sort-value="0.72" | 720 m || 
|-id=276 bgcolor=#d6d6d6
| 504276 ||  || — || October 4, 2006 || Mount Lemmon || Mount Lemmon Survey || EUP || align=right | 3.6 km || 
|-id=277 bgcolor=#d6d6d6
| 504277 ||  || — || November 17, 2006 || Mount Lemmon || Mount Lemmon Survey ||  || align=right | 3.3 km || 
|-id=278 bgcolor=#fefefe
| 504278 ||  || — || November 17, 2006 || Kitt Peak || Spacewatch ||  || align=right data-sort-value="0.61" | 610 m || 
|-id=279 bgcolor=#d6d6d6
| 504279 ||  || — || November 18, 2006 || Kitt Peak || Spacewatch ||  || align=right | 2.8 km || 
|-id=280 bgcolor=#fefefe
| 504280 ||  || — || October 21, 2006 || Mount Lemmon || Mount Lemmon Survey ||  || align=right data-sort-value="0.62" | 620 m || 
|-id=281 bgcolor=#d6d6d6
| 504281 ||  || — || November 13, 2006 || Catalina || CSS ||  || align=right | 3.0 km || 
|-id=282 bgcolor=#d6d6d6
| 504282 ||  || — || October 21, 2006 || Kitt Peak || Spacewatch ||  || align=right | 2.9 km || 
|-id=283 bgcolor=#fefefe
| 504283 ||  || — || November 18, 2006 || Mount Lemmon || Mount Lemmon Survey || H || align=right data-sort-value="0.65" | 650 m || 
|-id=284 bgcolor=#fefefe
| 504284 ||  || — || November 23, 2006 || Kitt Peak || Spacewatch || NYS || align=right data-sort-value="0.49" | 490 m || 
|-id=285 bgcolor=#fefefe
| 504285 ||  || — || December 10, 2006 || Kitt Peak || Spacewatch || MAS || align=right data-sort-value="0.71" | 710 m || 
|-id=286 bgcolor=#fefefe
| 504286 ||  || — || November 17, 2006 || Kitt Peak || Spacewatch ||  || align=right data-sort-value="0.72" | 720 m || 
|-id=287 bgcolor=#d6d6d6
| 504287 ||  || — || November 27, 2006 || Kitt Peak || Spacewatch || Tj (2.97) || align=right | 3.0 km || 
|-id=288 bgcolor=#d6d6d6
| 504288 ||  || — || September 27, 2006 || Mount Lemmon || Mount Lemmon Survey ||  || align=right | 3.1 km || 
|-id=289 bgcolor=#E9E9E9
| 504289 ||  || — || December 12, 2006 || Catalina || CSS ||  || align=right | 2.6 km || 
|-id=290 bgcolor=#fefefe
| 504290 ||  || — || November 18, 2006 || Mount Lemmon || Mount Lemmon Survey || V || align=right data-sort-value="0.51" | 510 m || 
|-id=291 bgcolor=#fefefe
| 504291 ||  || — || November 11, 2006 || Kitt Peak || Spacewatch || V || align=right data-sort-value="0.61" | 610 m || 
|-id=292 bgcolor=#d6d6d6
| 504292 ||  || — || November 25, 2006 || Mount Lemmon || Mount Lemmon Survey ||  || align=right | 2.6 km || 
|-id=293 bgcolor=#fefefe
| 504293 ||  || — || January 24, 2007 || Socorro || LINEAR ||  || align=right data-sort-value="0.74" | 740 m || 
|-id=294 bgcolor=#fefefe
| 504294 ||  || — || December 27, 2006 || Catalina || CSS ||  || align=right | 1.4 km || 
|-id=295 bgcolor=#d6d6d6
| 504295 ||  || — || December 20, 2006 || Mount Lemmon || Mount Lemmon Survey ||  || align=right | 2.0 km || 
|-id=296 bgcolor=#E9E9E9
| 504296 ||  || — || February 21, 2007 || Mount Lemmon || Mount Lemmon Survey ||  || align=right | 1.0 km || 
|-id=297 bgcolor=#E9E9E9
| 504297 ||  || — || February 21, 2007 || Mount Lemmon || Mount Lemmon Survey ||  || align=right | 1.3 km || 
|-id=298 bgcolor=#fefefe
| 504298 ||  || — || February 25, 2007 || Kitt Peak || Spacewatch ||  || align=right data-sort-value="0.51" | 510 m || 
|-id=299 bgcolor=#E9E9E9
| 504299 ||  || — || March 11, 2007 || Kitt Peak || Spacewatch ||  || align=right | 1.4 km || 
|-id=300 bgcolor=#E9E9E9
| 504300 ||  || — || March 12, 2007 || Kitt Peak || Spacewatch ||  || align=right | 1.8 km || 
|}

504301–504400 

|-bgcolor=#E9E9E9
| 504301 ||  || — || February 27, 2007 || Kitt Peak || Spacewatch ||  || align=right data-sort-value="0.86" | 860 m || 
|-id=302 bgcolor=#d6d6d6
| 504302 ||  || — || March 9, 2007 || Kitt Peak || Spacewatch || Tj (2.96) || align=right | 5.3 km || 
|-id=303 bgcolor=#E9E9E9
| 504303 ||  || — || April 14, 2007 || Mount Lemmon || Mount Lemmon Survey ||  || align=right data-sort-value="0.80" | 800 m || 
|-id=304 bgcolor=#E9E9E9
| 504304 ||  || — || April 14, 2007 || Kitt Peak || Spacewatch ||  || align=right data-sort-value="0.78" | 780 m || 
|-id=305 bgcolor=#E9E9E9
| 504305 ||  || — || October 9, 2004 || Kitt Peak || Spacewatch ||  || align=right | 1.7 km || 
|-id=306 bgcolor=#d6d6d6
| 504306 ||  || — || April 18, 2007 || Kitt Peak || Spacewatch || 3:2 || align=right | 4.2 km || 
|-id=307 bgcolor=#E9E9E9
| 504307 ||  || — || April 20, 2007 || Kitt Peak || Spacewatch ||  || align=right | 1.2 km || 
|-id=308 bgcolor=#E9E9E9
| 504308 ||  || — || April 20, 2007 || Kitt Peak || Spacewatch ||  || align=right | 1.1 km || 
|-id=309 bgcolor=#E9E9E9
| 504309 ||  || — || March 25, 2007 || Mount Lemmon || Mount Lemmon Survey ||  || align=right | 1.7 km || 
|-id=310 bgcolor=#E9E9E9
| 504310 ||  || — || April 23, 2007 || Catalina || CSS ||  || align=right | 3.8 km || 
|-id=311 bgcolor=#E9E9E9
| 504311 ||  || — || April 24, 2007 || Kitt Peak || Spacewatch ||  || align=right | 1.6 km || 
|-id=312 bgcolor=#E9E9E9
| 504312 ||  || — || June 7, 2007 || Kitt Peak || Spacewatch ||  || align=right | 1.9 km || 
|-id=313 bgcolor=#E9E9E9
| 504313 ||  || — || June 10, 2007 || Kitt Peak || Spacewatch ||  || align=right | 1.6 km || 
|-id=314 bgcolor=#E9E9E9
| 504314 ||  || — || May 12, 2007 || Mount Lemmon || Mount Lemmon Survey || HNS || align=right | 1.1 km || 
|-id=315 bgcolor=#FA8072
| 504315 ||  || — || September 3, 2007 || Catalina || CSS ||  || align=right data-sort-value="0.58" | 580 m || 
|-id=316 bgcolor=#fefefe
| 504316 ||  || — || September 9, 2007 || Kitt Peak || Spacewatch ||  || align=right data-sort-value="0.65" | 650 m || 
|-id=317 bgcolor=#d6d6d6
| 504317 ||  || — || September 9, 2007 || Kitt Peak || Spacewatch ||  || align=right | 2.4 km || 
|-id=318 bgcolor=#fefefe
| 504318 ||  || — || September 10, 2007 || Mount Lemmon || Mount Lemmon Survey ||  || align=right data-sort-value="0.64" | 640 m || 
|-id=319 bgcolor=#fefefe
| 504319 ||  || — || October 7, 2004 || Kitt Peak || Spacewatch ||  || align=right data-sort-value="0.55" | 550 m || 
|-id=320 bgcolor=#d6d6d6
| 504320 ||  || — || August 24, 2007 || Kitt Peak || Spacewatch ||  || align=right | 1.7 km || 
|-id=321 bgcolor=#fefefe
| 504321 ||  || — || September 8, 2007 || Anderson Mesa || LONEOS || (883) || align=right data-sort-value="0.73" | 730 m || 
|-id=322 bgcolor=#FA8072
| 504322 ||  || — || August 22, 2007 || Socorro || LINEAR ||  || align=right data-sort-value="0.59" | 590 m || 
|-id=323 bgcolor=#fefefe
| 504323 ||  || — || September 13, 2007 || Kitt Peak || Spacewatch ||  || align=right data-sort-value="0.57" | 570 m || 
|-id=324 bgcolor=#d6d6d6
| 504324 ||  || — || September 15, 2007 || Kitt Peak || Spacewatch || EOS || align=right | 1.6 km || 
|-id=325 bgcolor=#fefefe
| 504325 ||  || — || September 9, 2007 || Mount Lemmon || Mount Lemmon Survey ||  || align=right data-sort-value="0.59" | 590 m || 
|-id=326 bgcolor=#d6d6d6
| 504326 ||  || — || September 15, 2007 || Mount Lemmon || Mount Lemmon Survey ||  || align=right | 2.1 km || 
|-id=327 bgcolor=#d6d6d6
| 504327 ||  || — || September 11, 2007 || Mount Lemmon || Mount Lemmon Survey || KOR || align=right | 1.1 km || 
|-id=328 bgcolor=#fefefe
| 504328 ||  || — || September 11, 2007 || Kitt Peak || Spacewatch ||  || align=right data-sort-value="0.68" | 680 m || 
|-id=329 bgcolor=#fefefe
| 504329 ||  || — || September 12, 2007 || Mount Lemmon || Mount Lemmon Survey ||  || align=right data-sort-value="0.57" | 570 m || 
|-id=330 bgcolor=#fefefe
| 504330 ||  || — || September 8, 2007 || Mount Lemmon || Mount Lemmon Survey ||  || align=right data-sort-value="0.60" | 600 m || 
|-id=331 bgcolor=#fefefe
| 504331 ||  || — || September 12, 2007 || Mount Lemmon || Mount Lemmon Survey ||  || align=right data-sort-value="0.67" | 670 m || 
|-id=332 bgcolor=#d6d6d6
| 504332 ||  || — || October 8, 2007 || Mount Lemmon || Mount Lemmon Survey || EOS || align=right | 1.5 km || 
|-id=333 bgcolor=#fefefe
| 504333 ||  || — || September 11, 2007 || Mount Lemmon || Mount Lemmon Survey ||  || align=right data-sort-value="0.78" | 780 m || 
|-id=334 bgcolor=#fefefe
| 504334 ||  || — || October 9, 2007 || Mount Lemmon || Mount Lemmon Survey ||  || align=right data-sort-value="0.82" | 820 m || 
|-id=335 bgcolor=#fefefe
| 504335 ||  || — || October 6, 2007 || Socorro || LINEAR ||  || align=right data-sort-value="0.70" | 700 m || 
|-id=336 bgcolor=#fefefe
| 504336 ||  || — || October 9, 2007 || Socorro || LINEAR ||  || align=right data-sort-value="0.54" | 540 m || 
|-id=337 bgcolor=#fefefe
| 504337 ||  || — || October 12, 2007 || Socorro || LINEAR ||  || align=right data-sort-value="0.57" | 570 m || 
|-id=338 bgcolor=#fefefe
| 504338 ||  || — || October 9, 2007 || Kitt Peak || Spacewatch ||  || align=right data-sort-value="0.72" | 720 m || 
|-id=339 bgcolor=#d6d6d6
| 504339 ||  || — || October 8, 2007 || Kitt Peak || Spacewatch ||  || align=right | 1.7 km || 
|-id=340 bgcolor=#d6d6d6
| 504340 ||  || — || October 8, 2007 || Kitt Peak || Spacewatch ||  || align=right | 2.1 km || 
|-id=341 bgcolor=#fefefe
| 504341 ||  || — || October 7, 2007 || Kitt Peak || Spacewatch ||  || align=right data-sort-value="0.70" | 700 m || 
|-id=342 bgcolor=#d6d6d6
| 504342 ||  || — || October 8, 2007 || Catalina || CSS || EOS || align=right | 1.8 km || 
|-id=343 bgcolor=#d6d6d6
| 504343 ||  || — || October 8, 2007 || Kitt Peak || Spacewatch || KOR || align=right | 1.3 km || 
|-id=344 bgcolor=#d6d6d6
| 504344 ||  || — || October 8, 2007 || Kitt Peak || Spacewatch || EOS || align=right | 1.6 km || 
|-id=345 bgcolor=#E9E9E9
| 504345 ||  || — || October 10, 2007 || Kitt Peak || Spacewatch || HOF || align=right | 2.6 km || 
|-id=346 bgcolor=#d6d6d6
| 504346 ||  || — || October 10, 2007 || Mount Lemmon || Mount Lemmon Survey || EOS || align=right | 1.6 km || 
|-id=347 bgcolor=#d6d6d6
| 504347 ||  || — || October 9, 2007 || Mount Lemmon || Mount Lemmon Survey ||  || align=right | 2.0 km || 
|-id=348 bgcolor=#fefefe
| 504348 ||  || — || October 8, 2007 || Kitt Peak || Spacewatch ||  || align=right data-sort-value="0.76" | 760 m || 
|-id=349 bgcolor=#d6d6d6
| 504349 ||  || — || October 8, 2007 || Mount Lemmon || Mount Lemmon Survey ||  || align=right | 1.6 km || 
|-id=350 bgcolor=#E9E9E9
| 504350 ||  || — || October 4, 2007 || Mount Lemmon || Mount Lemmon Survey ||  || align=right | 2.2 km || 
|-id=351 bgcolor=#fefefe
| 504351 ||  || — || October 11, 2007 || Kitt Peak || Spacewatch || (2076) || align=right data-sort-value="0.57" | 570 m || 
|-id=352 bgcolor=#fefefe
| 504352 ||  || — || October 4, 2007 || Kitt Peak || Spacewatch ||  || align=right data-sort-value="0.49" | 490 m || 
|-id=353 bgcolor=#FA8072
| 504353 ||  || — || October 9, 2007 || Mount Lemmon || Mount Lemmon Survey || H || align=right data-sort-value="0.74" | 740 m || 
|-id=354 bgcolor=#d6d6d6
| 504354 ||  || — || October 12, 2007 || Kitt Peak || Spacewatch ||  || align=right | 1.8 km || 
|-id=355 bgcolor=#d6d6d6
| 504355 ||  || — || October 12, 2007 || Kitt Peak || Spacewatch || KOR || align=right data-sort-value="0.98" | 980 m || 
|-id=356 bgcolor=#d6d6d6
| 504356 ||  || — || October 12, 2007 || Kitt Peak || Spacewatch || KOR || align=right | 1.1 km || 
|-id=357 bgcolor=#fefefe
| 504357 ||  || — || October 18, 2007 || Kitt Peak || Spacewatch ||  || align=right data-sort-value="0.77" | 770 m || 
|-id=358 bgcolor=#d6d6d6
| 504358 ||  || — || October 16, 2007 || Catalina || CSS ||  || align=right | 3.3 km || 
|-id=359 bgcolor=#d6d6d6
| 504359 ||  || — || October 15, 2007 || Kitt Peak || Spacewatch || NAE || align=right | 2.0 km || 
|-id=360 bgcolor=#fefefe
| 504360 ||  || — || October 20, 2007 || Kitt Peak || Spacewatch ||  || align=right data-sort-value="0.46" | 460 m || 
|-id=361 bgcolor=#fefefe
| 504361 ||  || — || October 30, 2007 || Kitt Peak || Spacewatch ||  || align=right data-sort-value="0.49" | 490 m || 
|-id=362 bgcolor=#d6d6d6
| 504362 ||  || — || October 12, 2007 || Kitt Peak || Spacewatch || KOR || align=right | 1.3 km || 
|-id=363 bgcolor=#d6d6d6
| 504363 ||  || — || October 8, 2007 || Kitt Peak || Spacewatch || NAE || align=right | 2.1 km || 
|-id=364 bgcolor=#d6d6d6
| 504364 ||  || — || October 10, 2007 || Kitt Peak || Spacewatch ||  || align=right | 1.9 km || 
|-id=365 bgcolor=#d6d6d6
| 504365 ||  || — || October 15, 2007 || Kitt Peak || Spacewatch ||  || align=right | 2.4 km || 
|-id=366 bgcolor=#d6d6d6
| 504366 ||  || — || October 11, 2007 || Kitt Peak || Spacewatch ||  || align=right | 2.2 km || 
|-id=367 bgcolor=#fefefe
| 504367 ||  || — || October 20, 2007 || Mount Lemmon || Mount Lemmon Survey ||  || align=right data-sort-value="0.57" | 570 m || 
|-id=368 bgcolor=#fefefe
| 504368 ||  || — || October 18, 2007 || Kitt Peak || Spacewatch ||  || align=right | 1.1 km || 
|-id=369 bgcolor=#fefefe
| 504369 ||  || — || November 1, 2007 || Kitt Peak || Spacewatch ||  || align=right data-sort-value="0.65" | 650 m || 
|-id=370 bgcolor=#d6d6d6
| 504370 ||  || — || October 9, 2007 || Kitt Peak || Spacewatch ||  || align=right | 2.5 km || 
|-id=371 bgcolor=#d6d6d6
| 504371 ||  || — || October 10, 2007 || Anderson Mesa || LONEOS ||  || align=right | 3.0 km || 
|-id=372 bgcolor=#fefefe
| 504372 ||  || — || October 9, 2007 || Catalina || CSS || H || align=right data-sort-value="0.67" | 670 m || 
|-id=373 bgcolor=#d6d6d6
| 504373 ||  || — || November 1, 2007 || Kitt Peak || Spacewatch ||  || align=right | 2.3 km || 
|-id=374 bgcolor=#fefefe
| 504374 ||  || — || November 2, 2007 || Kitt Peak || Spacewatch ||  || align=right data-sort-value="0.86" | 860 m || 
|-id=375 bgcolor=#fefefe
| 504375 ||  || — || September 14, 2007 || Mount Lemmon || Mount Lemmon Survey ||  || align=right data-sort-value="0.53" | 530 m || 
|-id=376 bgcolor=#d6d6d6
| 504376 ||  || — || October 10, 2007 || Kitt Peak || Spacewatch ||  || align=right | 2.1 km || 
|-id=377 bgcolor=#fefefe
| 504377 ||  || — || September 18, 2007 || Mount Lemmon || Mount Lemmon Survey ||  || align=right data-sort-value="0.71" | 710 m || 
|-id=378 bgcolor=#fefefe
| 504378 ||  || — || November 1, 2007 || Kitt Peak || Spacewatch ||  || align=right data-sort-value="0.65" | 650 m || 
|-id=379 bgcolor=#fefefe
| 504379 ||  || — || November 1, 2007 || Kitt Peak || Spacewatch ||  || align=right data-sort-value="0.63" | 630 m || 
|-id=380 bgcolor=#d6d6d6
| 504380 ||  || — || October 15, 2007 || Mount Lemmon || Mount Lemmon Survey ||  || align=right | 2.7 km || 
|-id=381 bgcolor=#d6d6d6
| 504381 ||  || — || October 20, 2007 || Mount Lemmon || Mount Lemmon Survey ||  || align=right | 2.6 km || 
|-id=382 bgcolor=#fefefe
| 504382 ||  || — || November 4, 2007 || Kitt Peak || Spacewatch ||  || align=right data-sort-value="0.66" | 660 m || 
|-id=383 bgcolor=#d6d6d6
| 504383 ||  || — || November 1, 2007 || Kitt Peak || Spacewatch ||  || align=right | 2.1 km || 
|-id=384 bgcolor=#fefefe
| 504384 ||  || — || November 6, 2007 || Kitt Peak || Spacewatch ||  || align=right data-sort-value="0.60" | 600 m || 
|-id=385 bgcolor=#fefefe
| 504385 ||  || — || November 8, 2007 || Socorro || LINEAR ||  || align=right data-sort-value="0.72" | 720 m || 
|-id=386 bgcolor=#d6d6d6
| 504386 ||  || — || November 4, 2007 || Mount Lemmon || Mount Lemmon Survey ||  || align=right | 2.7 km || 
|-id=387 bgcolor=#d6d6d6
| 504387 ||  || — || November 4, 2007 || Mount Lemmon || Mount Lemmon Survey || (1118) || align=right | 3.4 km || 
|-id=388 bgcolor=#fefefe
| 504388 ||  || — || April 2, 2006 || Kitt Peak || Spacewatch ||  || align=right data-sort-value="0.58" | 580 m || 
|-id=389 bgcolor=#fefefe
| 504389 ||  || — || November 7, 2007 || Catalina || CSS ||  || align=right data-sort-value="0.71" | 710 m || 
|-id=390 bgcolor=#d6d6d6
| 504390 ||  || — || October 18, 2007 || Kitt Peak || Spacewatch ||  || align=right | 2.1 km || 
|-id=391 bgcolor=#d6d6d6
| 504391 ||  || — || November 5, 2007 || Mount Lemmon || Mount Lemmon Survey ||  || align=right | 2.9 km || 
|-id=392 bgcolor=#FFC2E0
| 504392 ||  || — || November 15, 2007 || Catalina || CSS || AMOcritical || align=right data-sort-value="0.45" | 450 m || 
|-id=393 bgcolor=#d6d6d6
| 504393 ||  || — || November 2, 2007 || Mount Lemmon || Mount Lemmon Survey || EOS || align=right | 1.2 km || 
|-id=394 bgcolor=#d6d6d6
| 504394 ||  || — || November 13, 2007 || Kitt Peak || Spacewatch ||  || align=right | 1.8 km || 
|-id=395 bgcolor=#fefefe
| 504395 ||  || — || October 17, 2007 || Mount Lemmon || Mount Lemmon Survey ||  || align=right data-sort-value="0.55" | 550 m || 
|-id=396 bgcolor=#fefefe
| 504396 ||  || — || November 12, 2007 || Mount Lemmon || Mount Lemmon Survey ||  || align=right data-sort-value="0.49" | 490 m || 
|-id=397 bgcolor=#d6d6d6
| 504397 ||  || — || November 5, 2007 || Mount Lemmon || Mount Lemmon Survey ||  || align=right | 2.3 km || 
|-id=398 bgcolor=#d6d6d6
| 504398 ||  || — || November 5, 2007 || Mount Lemmon || Mount Lemmon Survey || EOS || align=right | 1.8 km || 
|-id=399 bgcolor=#d6d6d6
| 504399 ||  || — || November 12, 2007 || Mount Lemmon || Mount Lemmon Survey ||  || align=right | 2.4 km || 
|-id=400 bgcolor=#fefefe
| 504400 ||  || — || November 2, 2007 || Kitt Peak || Spacewatch ||  || align=right data-sort-value="0.70" | 700 m || 
|}

504401–504500 

|-bgcolor=#d6d6d6
| 504401 ||  || — || November 7, 2007 || Mount Lemmon || Mount Lemmon Survey ||  || align=right | 2.3 km || 
|-id=402 bgcolor=#d6d6d6
| 504402 ||  || — || October 9, 2007 || Kitt Peak || Spacewatch ||  || align=right | 2.5 km || 
|-id=403 bgcolor=#d6d6d6
| 504403 ||  || — || November 18, 2007 || Mount Lemmon || Mount Lemmon Survey || KOR || align=right | 1.1 km || 
|-id=404 bgcolor=#d6d6d6
| 504404 ||  || — || November 19, 2007 || Mount Lemmon || Mount Lemmon Survey ||  || align=right | 2.4 km || 
|-id=405 bgcolor=#d6d6d6
| 504405 ||  || — || October 21, 2007 || Mount Lemmon || Mount Lemmon Survey || EOS || align=right | 1.4 km || 
|-id=406 bgcolor=#fefefe
| 504406 ||  || — || November 17, 2007 || Socorro || LINEAR ||  || align=right data-sort-value="0.67" | 670 m || 
|-id=407 bgcolor=#fefefe
| 504407 ||  || — || November 2, 2007 || Kitt Peak || Spacewatch ||  || align=right data-sort-value="0.74" | 740 m || 
|-id=408 bgcolor=#d6d6d6
| 504408 ||  || — || November 4, 2007 || Kitt Peak || Spacewatch ||  || align=right | 2.7 km || 
|-id=409 bgcolor=#d6d6d6
| 504409 ||  || — || December 13, 2007 || Socorro || LINEAR ||  || align=right | 3.5 km || 
|-id=410 bgcolor=#fefefe
| 504410 ||  || — || December 5, 2007 || Kitt Peak || Spacewatch || H || align=right data-sort-value="0.63" | 630 m || 
|-id=411 bgcolor=#d6d6d6
| 504411 ||  || — || December 15, 2007 || Kitt Peak || Spacewatch ||  || align=right | 2.6 km || 
|-id=412 bgcolor=#d6d6d6
| 504412 ||  || — || December 5, 2007 || Kitt Peak || Spacewatch ||  || align=right | 2.9 km || 
|-id=413 bgcolor=#d6d6d6
| 504413 ||  || — || November 9, 2007 || Socorro || LINEAR || TIR || align=right | 2.8 km || 
|-id=414 bgcolor=#d6d6d6
| 504414 ||  || — || December 4, 2007 || Kitt Peak || Spacewatch ||  || align=right | 3.0 km || 
|-id=415 bgcolor=#fefefe
| 504415 ||  || — || December 3, 2007 || Kitt Peak || Spacewatch ||  || align=right data-sort-value="0.54" | 540 m || 
|-id=416 bgcolor=#d6d6d6
| 504416 ||  || — || December 5, 2007 || Kitt Peak || Spacewatch ||  || align=right | 1.7 km || 
|-id=417 bgcolor=#d6d6d6
| 504417 ||  || — || December 30, 2007 || Mount Lemmon || Mount Lemmon Survey ||  || align=right | 2.2 km || 
|-id=418 bgcolor=#fefefe
| 504418 ||  || — || December 31, 2007 || Mount Lemmon || Mount Lemmon Survey || V || align=right data-sort-value="0.64" | 640 m || 
|-id=419 bgcolor=#fefefe
| 504419 ||  || — || December 30, 2007 || Kitt Peak || Spacewatch ||  || align=right data-sort-value="0.56" | 560 m || 
|-id=420 bgcolor=#d6d6d6
| 504420 ||  || — || December 30, 2007 || Kitt Peak || Spacewatch ||  || align=right | 2.8 km || 
|-id=421 bgcolor=#d6d6d6
| 504421 ||  || — || January 10, 2008 || Mount Lemmon || Mount Lemmon Survey ||  || align=right | 1.9 km || 
|-id=422 bgcolor=#d6d6d6
| 504422 ||  || — || January 10, 2008 || Mount Lemmon || Mount Lemmon Survey ||  || align=right | 3.3 km || 
|-id=423 bgcolor=#d6d6d6
| 504423 ||  || — || January 3, 2008 || Calvin-Rehoboth || Calvin–Rehoboth Obs. ||  || align=right | 2.3 km || 
|-id=424 bgcolor=#d6d6d6
| 504424 ||  || — || January 10, 2008 || Mount Lemmon || Mount Lemmon Survey ||  || align=right | 2.5 km || 
|-id=425 bgcolor=#fefefe
| 504425 ||  || — || January 10, 2008 || Kitt Peak || Spacewatch || H || align=right data-sort-value="0.50" | 500 m || 
|-id=426 bgcolor=#d6d6d6
| 504426 ||  || — || November 12, 2007 || Mount Lemmon || Mount Lemmon Survey ||  || align=right | 1.8 km || 
|-id=427 bgcolor=#d6d6d6
| 504427 ||  || — || December 14, 2007 || Mount Lemmon || Mount Lemmon Survey ||  || align=right | 2.8 km || 
|-id=428 bgcolor=#fefefe
| 504428 ||  || — || December 30, 2007 || Kitt Peak || Spacewatch ||  || align=right data-sort-value="0.61" | 610 m || 
|-id=429 bgcolor=#d6d6d6
| 504429 ||  || — || January 11, 2008 || Kitt Peak || Spacewatch ||  || align=right | 2.4 km || 
|-id=430 bgcolor=#fefefe
| 504430 ||  || — || December 30, 2007 || Kitt Peak || Spacewatch ||  || align=right data-sort-value="0.75" | 750 m || 
|-id=431 bgcolor=#d6d6d6
| 504431 ||  || — || December 30, 2007 || Kitt Peak || Spacewatch ||  || align=right | 2.5 km || 
|-id=432 bgcolor=#d6d6d6
| 504432 ||  || — || January 12, 2008 || Kitt Peak || Spacewatch ||  || align=right | 2.6 km || 
|-id=433 bgcolor=#fefefe
| 504433 ||  || — || December 31, 2007 || Kitt Peak || Spacewatch ||  || align=right data-sort-value="0.64" | 640 m || 
|-id=434 bgcolor=#fefefe
| 504434 ||  || — || September 25, 2006 || Kitt Peak || Spacewatch || NYS || align=right data-sort-value="0.63" | 630 m || 
|-id=435 bgcolor=#d6d6d6
| 504435 ||  || — || January 1, 2008 || Kitt Peak || Spacewatch || VER || align=right | 2.3 km || 
|-id=436 bgcolor=#d6d6d6
| 504436 ||  || — || January 11, 2008 || Mount Lemmon || Mount Lemmon Survey ||  || align=right | 2.4 km || 
|-id=437 bgcolor=#fefefe
| 504437 ||  || — || January 11, 2008 || Mount Lemmon || Mount Lemmon Survey ||  || align=right data-sort-value="0.88" | 880 m || 
|-id=438 bgcolor=#d6d6d6
| 504438 ||  || — || December 15, 2007 || Mount Lemmon || Mount Lemmon Survey ||  || align=right | 2.4 km || 
|-id=439 bgcolor=#fefefe
| 504439 ||  || — || January 31, 2008 || Mount Lemmon || Mount Lemmon Survey || H || align=right data-sort-value="0.55" | 550 m || 
|-id=440 bgcolor=#E9E9E9
| 504440 ||  || — || December 31, 2007 || Mount Lemmon || Mount Lemmon Survey ||  || align=right | 2.9 km || 
|-id=441 bgcolor=#fefefe
| 504441 ||  || — || January 30, 2008 || Mount Lemmon || Mount Lemmon Survey ||  || align=right data-sort-value="0.83" | 830 m || 
|-id=442 bgcolor=#d6d6d6
| 504442 ||  || — || January 19, 2008 || Mount Lemmon || Mount Lemmon Survey ||  || align=right | 2.6 km || 
|-id=443 bgcolor=#d6d6d6
| 504443 ||  || — || February 2, 2008 || Vail-Jarnac || Jarnac Obs. ||  || align=right | 2.6 km || 
|-id=444 bgcolor=#d6d6d6
| 504444 ||  || — || January 10, 2008 || Kitt Peak || Spacewatch ||  || align=right | 2.6 km || 
|-id=445 bgcolor=#d6d6d6
| 504445 ||  || — || January 16, 2008 || Kitt Peak || Spacewatch ||  || align=right | 2.4 km || 
|-id=446 bgcolor=#d6d6d6
| 504446 ||  || — || February 10, 2008 || Altschwendt || W. Ries ||  || align=right | 1.9 km || 
|-id=447 bgcolor=#d6d6d6
| 504447 ||  || — || December 30, 2007 || Mount Lemmon || Mount Lemmon Survey || LIX || align=right | 3.5 km || 
|-id=448 bgcolor=#fefefe
| 504448 ||  || — || February 8, 2008 || Kitt Peak || Spacewatch ||  || align=right data-sort-value="0.67" | 670 m || 
|-id=449 bgcolor=#fefefe
| 504449 ||  || — || February 9, 2008 || Purple Mountain || PMO NEO ||  || align=right data-sort-value="0.67" | 670 m || 
|-id=450 bgcolor=#fefefe
| 504450 ||  || — || January 31, 2008 || Mount Lemmon || Mount Lemmon Survey || H || align=right data-sort-value="0.61" | 610 m || 
|-id=451 bgcolor=#fefefe
| 504451 ||  || — || February 7, 2008 || Kitt Peak || Spacewatch ||  || align=right data-sort-value="0.51" | 510 m || 
|-id=452 bgcolor=#d6d6d6
| 504452 ||  || — || January 30, 2008 || Mount Lemmon || Mount Lemmon Survey ||  || align=right | 2.9 km || 
|-id=453 bgcolor=#d6d6d6
| 504453 ||  || — || February 8, 2008 || Kitt Peak || Spacewatch ||  || align=right | 1.7 km || 
|-id=454 bgcolor=#fefefe
| 504454 ||  || — || February 8, 2008 || Kitt Peak || Spacewatch ||  || align=right data-sort-value="0.69" | 690 m || 
|-id=455 bgcolor=#d6d6d6
| 504455 ||  || — || January 10, 2008 || Mount Lemmon || Mount Lemmon Survey ||  || align=right | 2.7 km || 
|-id=456 bgcolor=#d6d6d6
| 504456 ||  || — || January 31, 2008 || Mount Lemmon || Mount Lemmon Survey ||  || align=right | 2.6 km || 
|-id=457 bgcolor=#fefefe
| 504457 ||  || — || December 31, 2007 || Mount Lemmon || Mount Lemmon Survey || H || align=right data-sort-value="0.63" | 630 m || 
|-id=458 bgcolor=#fefefe
| 504458 ||  || — || January 12, 2008 || Catalina || CSS ||  || align=right | 1.3 km || 
|-id=459 bgcolor=#fefefe
| 504459 ||  || — || January 15, 2008 || Kitt Peak || Spacewatch ||  || align=right data-sort-value="0.89" | 890 m || 
|-id=460 bgcolor=#d6d6d6
| 504460 ||  || — || February 8, 2008 || Kitt Peak || Spacewatch || TIR || align=right | 2.7 km || 
|-id=461 bgcolor=#fefefe
| 504461 ||  || — || February 2, 2008 || Mount Lemmon || Mount Lemmon Survey || NYS || align=right data-sort-value="0.58" | 580 m || 
|-id=462 bgcolor=#fefefe
| 504462 ||  || — || February 3, 2008 || Kitt Peak || Spacewatch ||  || align=right data-sort-value="0.78" | 780 m || 
|-id=463 bgcolor=#d6d6d6
| 504463 ||  || — || January 12, 2008 || Kitt Peak || Spacewatch ||  || align=right | 2.9 km || 
|-id=464 bgcolor=#d6d6d6
| 504464 ||  || — || February 28, 2008 || Catalina || CSS ||  || align=right | 2.7 km || 
|-id=465 bgcolor=#d6d6d6
| 504465 ||  || — || January 11, 2008 || Kitt Peak || Spacewatch ||  || align=right | 2.4 km || 
|-id=466 bgcolor=#d6d6d6
| 504466 ||  || — || October 18, 2007 || Mount Lemmon || Mount Lemmon Survey ||  || align=right | 2.8 km || 
|-id=467 bgcolor=#d6d6d6
| 504467 ||  || — || April 7, 2003 || Kitt Peak || Spacewatch || TIR || align=right | 2.9 km || 
|-id=468 bgcolor=#fefefe
| 504468 ||  || — || February 27, 2008 || Kitt Peak || Spacewatch || H || align=right data-sort-value="0.39" | 390 m || 
|-id=469 bgcolor=#d6d6d6
| 504469 ||  || — || February 28, 2008 || Mount Lemmon || Mount Lemmon Survey ||  || align=right | 2.3 km || 
|-id=470 bgcolor=#fefefe
| 504470 ||  || — || February 29, 2008 || Kitt Peak || Spacewatch || H || align=right data-sort-value="0.65" | 650 m || 
|-id=471 bgcolor=#fefefe
| 504471 ||  || — || February 2, 2008 || Mount Lemmon || Mount Lemmon Survey || MAS || align=right data-sort-value="0.65" | 650 m || 
|-id=472 bgcolor=#d6d6d6
| 504472 ||  || — || February 24, 2008 || Kitt Peak || Spacewatch ||  || align=right | 2.4 km || 
|-id=473 bgcolor=#fefefe
| 504473 ||  || — || March 3, 2008 || Kitt Peak || Spacewatch || H || align=right data-sort-value="0.49" | 490 m || 
|-id=474 bgcolor=#fefefe
| 504474 ||  || — || March 4, 2008 || Kitt Peak || Spacewatch ||  || align=right data-sort-value="0.76" | 760 m || 
|-id=475 bgcolor=#fefefe
| 504475 ||  || — || March 2, 2008 || Mount Lemmon || Mount Lemmon Survey ||  || align=right data-sort-value="0.73" | 730 m || 
|-id=476 bgcolor=#fefefe
| 504476 ||  || — || March 7, 2008 || Kitt Peak || Spacewatch || H || align=right data-sort-value="0.56" | 560 m || 
|-id=477 bgcolor=#d6d6d6
| 504477 ||  || — || March 3, 2008 || XuYi || PMO NEO ||  || align=right | 3.5 km || 
|-id=478 bgcolor=#d6d6d6
| 504478 ||  || — || February 9, 2008 || Kitt Peak || Spacewatch ||  || align=right | 3.0 km || 
|-id=479 bgcolor=#d6d6d6
| 504479 ||  || — || March 6, 2008 || Mount Lemmon || Mount Lemmon Survey ||  || align=right | 3.0 km || 
|-id=480 bgcolor=#fefefe
| 504480 ||  || — || March 4, 2008 || Mount Lemmon || Mount Lemmon Survey ||  || align=right data-sort-value="0.81" | 810 m || 
|-id=481 bgcolor=#d6d6d6
| 504481 ||  || — || March 27, 2008 || Kitt Peak || Spacewatch ||  || align=right | 2.8 km || 
|-id=482 bgcolor=#d6d6d6
| 504482 ||  || — || March 28, 2008 || Mount Lemmon || Mount Lemmon Survey ||  || align=right | 2.5 km || 
|-id=483 bgcolor=#fefefe
| 504483 ||  || — || February 10, 2008 || Kitt Peak || Spacewatch ||  || align=right data-sort-value="0.61" | 610 m || 
|-id=484 bgcolor=#E9E9E9
| 504484 ||  || — || March 30, 2008 || Kitt Peak || Spacewatch ||  || align=right data-sort-value="0.91" | 910 m || 
|-id=485 bgcolor=#d6d6d6
| 504485 ||  || — || February 9, 2008 || Mount Lemmon || Mount Lemmon Survey ||  || align=right | 2.8 km || 
|-id=486 bgcolor=#fefefe
| 504486 ||  || — || March 11, 2008 || Mount Lemmon || Mount Lemmon Survey ||  || align=right data-sort-value="0.71" | 710 m || 
|-id=487 bgcolor=#fefefe
| 504487 ||  || — || March 30, 2008 || Kitt Peak || Spacewatch || H || align=right data-sort-value="0.57" | 570 m || 
|-id=488 bgcolor=#fefefe
| 504488 ||  || — || March 29, 2008 || Kitt Peak || Spacewatch || SUL || align=right | 1.9 km || 
|-id=489 bgcolor=#d6d6d6
| 504489 ||  || — || April 3, 2008 || Mount Lemmon || Mount Lemmon Survey ||  || align=right | 2.7 km || 
|-id=490 bgcolor=#d6d6d6
| 504490 ||  || — || March 6, 2008 || Mount Lemmon || Mount Lemmon Survey ||  || align=right | 2.7 km || 
|-id=491 bgcolor=#fefefe
| 504491 ||  || — || April 1, 2008 || Kitt Peak || Spacewatch || MAS || align=right data-sort-value="0.61" | 610 m || 
|-id=492 bgcolor=#fefefe
| 504492 ||  || — || April 8, 2008 || Catalina || CSS ||  || align=right | 1.2 km || 
|-id=493 bgcolor=#fefefe
| 504493 ||  || — || April 9, 2008 || Kitt Peak || Spacewatch ||  || align=right data-sort-value="0.71" | 710 m || 
|-id=494 bgcolor=#fefefe
| 504494 ||  || — || April 24, 2008 || Kitt Peak || Spacewatch ||  || align=right data-sort-value="0.68" | 680 m || 
|-id=495 bgcolor=#fefefe
| 504495 ||  || — || April 28, 2008 || Kitt Peak || Spacewatch || H || align=right data-sort-value="0.69" | 690 m || 
|-id=496 bgcolor=#fefefe
| 504496 ||  || — || September 25, 2006 || Mount Lemmon || Mount Lemmon Survey || H || align=right data-sort-value="0.56" | 560 m || 
|-id=497 bgcolor=#E9E9E9
| 504497 ||  || — || May 1, 2008 || Catalina || CSS || BAR || align=right | 1.4 km || 
|-id=498 bgcolor=#fefefe
| 504498 ||  || — || April 6, 2008 || Mount Lemmon || Mount Lemmon Survey || H || align=right data-sort-value="0.70" | 700 m || 
|-id=499 bgcolor=#E9E9E9
| 504499 ||  || — || May 3, 2008 || Mount Lemmon || Mount Lemmon Survey ||  || align=right data-sort-value="0.79" | 790 m || 
|-id=500 bgcolor=#E9E9E9
| 504500 ||  || — || April 27, 2008 || Mount Lemmon || Mount Lemmon Survey || EUN || align=right data-sort-value="0.89" | 890 m || 
|}

504501–504600 

|-bgcolor=#fefefe
| 504501 ||  || — || June 3, 2008 || Mount Lemmon || Mount Lemmon Survey || H || align=right data-sort-value="0.68" | 680 m || 
|-id=502 bgcolor=#E9E9E9
| 504502 ||  || — || June 3, 2008 || Mount Lemmon || Mount Lemmon Survey ||  || align=right data-sort-value="0.95" | 950 m || 
|-id=503 bgcolor=#FA8072
| 504503 ||  || — || April 30, 2008 || Mount Lemmon || Mount Lemmon Survey || H || align=right data-sort-value="0.71" | 710 m || 
|-id=504 bgcolor=#E9E9E9
| 504504 ||  || — || June 26, 2008 || La Sagra || OAM Obs. ||  || align=right data-sort-value="0.92" | 920 m || 
|-id=505 bgcolor=#FFC2E0
| 504505 ||  || — || June 28, 2008 || Siding Spring || SSS || AMOcritical || align=right data-sort-value="0.78" | 780 m || 
|-id=506 bgcolor=#E9E9E9
| 504506 ||  || — || June 30, 2008 || Eskridge || G. Hug ||  || align=right | 1.4 km || 
|-id=507 bgcolor=#E9E9E9
| 504507 ||  || — || June 30, 2008 || Socorro || LINEAR ||  || align=right | 2.3 km || 
|-id=508 bgcolor=#E9E9E9
| 504508 ||  || — || July 29, 2008 || Kitt Peak || Spacewatch ||  || align=right | 1.2 km || 
|-id=509 bgcolor=#E9E9E9
| 504509 ||  || — || August 8, 2008 || La Sagra || OAM Obs. ||  || align=right | 1.6 km || 
|-id=510 bgcolor=#E9E9E9
| 504510 ||  || — || August 7, 2008 || Kitt Peak || Spacewatch ||  || align=right | 1.4 km || 
|-id=511 bgcolor=#E9E9E9
| 504511 ||  || — || August 26, 2008 || Piszkéstető || K. Sárneczky ||  || align=right | 1.5 km || 
|-id=512 bgcolor=#E9E9E9
| 504512 ||  || — || August 5, 2008 || La Sagra || OAM Obs. ||  || align=right | 1.6 km || 
|-id=513 bgcolor=#E9E9E9
| 504513 ||  || — || July 1, 2008 || Catalina || CSS ||  || align=right | 1.8 km || 
|-id=514 bgcolor=#E9E9E9
| 504514 ||  || — || August 30, 2008 || Socorro || LINEAR ||  || align=right | 2.4 km || 
|-id=515 bgcolor=#E9E9E9
| 504515 ||  || — || August 30, 2008 || Socorro || LINEAR ||  || align=right | 2.0 km || 
|-id=516 bgcolor=#E9E9E9
| 504516 ||  || — || September 2, 2008 || Kitt Peak || Spacewatch ||  || align=right | 1.3 km || 
|-id=517 bgcolor=#E9E9E9
| 504517 ||  || — || August 25, 2008 || La Sagra || OAM Obs. ||  || align=right | 1.9 km || 
|-id=518 bgcolor=#E9E9E9
| 504518 ||  || — || August 24, 2008 || Kitt Peak || Spacewatch ||  || align=right | 1.4 km || 
|-id=519 bgcolor=#E9E9E9
| 504519 ||  || — || September 2, 2008 || Kitt Peak || Spacewatch ||  || align=right | 1.1 km || 
|-id=520 bgcolor=#E9E9E9
| 504520 ||  || — || September 3, 2008 || Kitt Peak || Spacewatch ||  || align=right | 1.8 km || 
|-id=521 bgcolor=#E9E9E9
| 504521 ||  || — || September 3, 2008 || Kitt Peak || Spacewatch ||  || align=right | 1.3 km || 
|-id=522 bgcolor=#E9E9E9
| 504522 ||  || — || September 4, 2008 || Kitt Peak || Spacewatch ||  || align=right | 1.4 km || 
|-id=523 bgcolor=#E9E9E9
| 504523 ||  || — || September 4, 2008 || Kitt Peak || Spacewatch ||  || align=right | 1.6 km || 
|-id=524 bgcolor=#E9E9E9
| 504524 ||  || — || September 6, 2008 || Mount Lemmon || Mount Lemmon Survey ||  || align=right | 1.4 km || 
|-id=525 bgcolor=#E9E9E9
| 504525 ||  || — || September 5, 2008 || Kitt Peak || Spacewatch ||  || align=right | 1.5 km || 
|-id=526 bgcolor=#E9E9E9
| 504526 ||  || — || September 5, 2008 || Kitt Peak || Spacewatch ||  || align=right | 1.3 km || 
|-id=527 bgcolor=#E9E9E9
| 504527 ||  || — || September 5, 2008 || Kitt Peak || Spacewatch ||  || align=right | 2.1 km || 
|-id=528 bgcolor=#E9E9E9
| 504528 ||  || — || September 5, 2008 || Kitt Peak || Spacewatch ||  || align=right | 1.3 km || 
|-id=529 bgcolor=#E9E9E9
| 504529 ||  || — || September 2, 2008 || Kitt Peak || Spacewatch ||  || align=right | 1.2 km || 
|-id=530 bgcolor=#E9E9E9
| 504530 ||  || — || February 1, 2006 || Kitt Peak || Spacewatch ||  || align=right | 1.4 km || 
|-id=531 bgcolor=#E9E9E9
| 504531 ||  || — || September 4, 2008 || Socorro || LINEAR ||  || align=right | 2.0 km || 
|-id=532 bgcolor=#E9E9E9
| 504532 ||  || — || September 22, 2008 || Goodricke-Pigott || R. A. Tucker ||  || align=right | 1.4 km || 
|-id=533 bgcolor=#E9E9E9
| 504533 ||  || — || September 7, 2008 || Mount Lemmon || Mount Lemmon Survey ||  || align=right | 1.6 km || 
|-id=534 bgcolor=#E9E9E9
| 504534 ||  || — || September 19, 2008 || Kitt Peak || Spacewatch ||  || align=right | 1.4 km || 
|-id=535 bgcolor=#E9E9E9
| 504535 ||  || — || September 20, 2008 || Kitt Peak || Spacewatch ||  || align=right | 1.4 km || 
|-id=536 bgcolor=#E9E9E9
| 504536 ||  || — || August 29, 2008 || La Sagra || OAM Obs. ||  || align=right | 1.5 km || 
|-id=537 bgcolor=#E9E9E9
| 504537 ||  || — || September 20, 2008 || Mount Lemmon || Mount Lemmon Survey ||  || align=right | 1.4 km || 
|-id=538 bgcolor=#E9E9E9
| 504538 ||  || — || July 30, 2008 || Mount Lemmon || Mount Lemmon Survey ||  || align=right | 1.2 km || 
|-id=539 bgcolor=#E9E9E9
| 504539 ||  || — || September 21, 2008 || Kitt Peak || Spacewatch ||  || align=right | 1.4 km || 
|-id=540 bgcolor=#E9E9E9
| 504540 ||  || — || September 21, 2008 || Kitt Peak || Spacewatch || NEM || align=right | 2.0 km || 
|-id=541 bgcolor=#E9E9E9
| 504541 ||  || — || September 21, 2008 || Kitt Peak || Spacewatch ||  || align=right | 1.9 km || 
|-id=542 bgcolor=#E9E9E9
| 504542 ||  || — || September 22, 2008 || Mount Lemmon || Mount Lemmon Survey ||  || align=right | 2.3 km || 
|-id=543 bgcolor=#E9E9E9
| 504543 ||  || — || September 22, 2008 || Mount Lemmon || Mount Lemmon Survey ||  || align=right | 1.7 km || 
|-id=544 bgcolor=#E9E9E9
| 504544 ||  || — || September 22, 2008 || Mount Lemmon || Mount Lemmon Survey || MRX || align=right data-sort-value="0.95" | 950 m || 
|-id=545 bgcolor=#E9E9E9
| 504545 ||  || — || September 22, 2008 || Kitt Peak || Spacewatch || PAD || align=right | 1.4 km || 
|-id=546 bgcolor=#E9E9E9
| 504546 ||  || — || August 24, 2008 || Kitt Peak || Spacewatch ||  || align=right | 1.3 km || 
|-id=547 bgcolor=#E9E9E9
| 504547 ||  || — || September 6, 2008 || Mount Lemmon || Mount Lemmon Survey ||  || align=right | 2.2 km || 
|-id=548 bgcolor=#E9E9E9
| 504548 ||  || — || September 6, 2008 || Mount Lemmon || Mount Lemmon Survey ||  || align=right | 2.0 km || 
|-id=549 bgcolor=#E9E9E9
| 504549 ||  || — || September 21, 2008 || Kitt Peak || Spacewatch || AEO || align=right data-sort-value="0.93" | 930 m || 
|-id=550 bgcolor=#E9E9E9
| 504550 ||  || — || September 28, 2008 || Catalina || CSS ||  || align=right | 1.4 km || 
|-id=551 bgcolor=#E9E9E9
| 504551 ||  || — || September 5, 2008 || Kitt Peak || Spacewatch ||  || align=right | 1.4 km || 
|-id=552 bgcolor=#E9E9E9
| 504552 ||  || — || September 23, 2008 || Kitt Peak || Spacewatch || WIT || align=right data-sort-value="0.77" | 770 m || 
|-id=553 bgcolor=#E9E9E9
| 504553 ||  || — || September 23, 2008 || Kitt Peak || Spacewatch || AGN || align=right data-sort-value="0.94" | 940 m || 
|-id=554 bgcolor=#E9E9E9
| 504554 ||  || — || September 28, 2008 || Catalina || CSS ||  || align=right | 1.5 km || 
|-id=555 bgcolor=#C2E0FF
| 504555 ||  || — || September 24, 2008 || Palomar || M. E. Schwamb, M. E. Brown, D. L. Rabinowitz || plutino || align=right | 227 km || 
|-id=556 bgcolor=#E9E9E9
| 504556 ||  || — || September 24, 2008 || Mount Lemmon || Mount Lemmon Survey ||  || align=right | 1.6 km || 
|-id=557 bgcolor=#E9E9E9
| 504557 ||  || — || September 24, 2008 || Mount Lemmon || Mount Lemmon Survey ||  || align=right | 2.2 km || 
|-id=558 bgcolor=#E9E9E9
| 504558 ||  || — || September 24, 2008 || Mount Lemmon || Mount Lemmon Survey ||  || align=right | 1.3 km || 
|-id=559 bgcolor=#E9E9E9
| 504559 ||  || — || September 24, 2008 || Mount Lemmon || Mount Lemmon Survey || NEM || align=right | 2.1 km || 
|-id=560 bgcolor=#E9E9E9
| 504560 ||  || — || September 24, 2008 || Catalina || CSS ||  || align=right | 1.6 km || 
|-id=561 bgcolor=#E9E9E9
| 504561 ||  || — || September 21, 2008 || Kitt Peak || Spacewatch ||  || align=right | 1.3 km || 
|-id=562 bgcolor=#E9E9E9
| 504562 ||  || — || September 24, 2008 || Kitt Peak || Spacewatch ||  || align=right | 1.6 km || 
|-id=563 bgcolor=#E9E9E9
| 504563 ||  || — || September 26, 2008 || Kitt Peak || Spacewatch ||  || align=right | 1.7 km || 
|-id=564 bgcolor=#E9E9E9
| 504564 ||  || — || October 7, 2008 || Tiki || N. Teamo ||  || align=right | 1.7 km || 
|-id=565 bgcolor=#E9E9E9
| 504565 ||  || — || October 1, 2008 || Kitt Peak || Spacewatch ||  || align=right | 1.6 km || 
|-id=566 bgcolor=#E9E9E9
| 504566 ||  || — || September 6, 2008 || Mount Lemmon || Mount Lemmon Survey ||  || align=right | 1.7 km || 
|-id=567 bgcolor=#E9E9E9
| 504567 ||  || — || October 1, 2008 || Mount Lemmon || Mount Lemmon Survey ||  || align=right | 1.7 km || 
|-id=568 bgcolor=#FA8072
| 504568 ||  || — || October 9, 2008 || Catalina || CSS ||  || align=right data-sort-value="0.31" | 310 m || 
|-id=569 bgcolor=#E9E9E9
| 504569 ||  || — || September 20, 2008 || Kitt Peak || Spacewatch ||  || align=right | 1.8 km || 
|-id=570 bgcolor=#E9E9E9
| 504570 ||  || — || October 1, 2008 || Mount Lemmon || Mount Lemmon Survey ||  || align=right | 1.4 km || 
|-id=571 bgcolor=#E9E9E9
| 504571 ||  || — || October 1, 2008 || Kitt Peak || Spacewatch ||  || align=right | 1.9 km || 
|-id=572 bgcolor=#E9E9E9
| 504572 ||  || — || October 2, 2008 || Kitt Peak || Spacewatch ||  || align=right | 1.7 km || 
|-id=573 bgcolor=#E9E9E9
| 504573 ||  || — || October 2, 2008 || Kitt Peak || Spacewatch ||  || align=right | 1.1 km || 
|-id=574 bgcolor=#E9E9E9
| 504574 ||  || — || October 2, 2008 || Kitt Peak || Spacewatch ||  || align=right | 2.4 km || 
|-id=575 bgcolor=#E9E9E9
| 504575 ||  || — || September 23, 2008 || Kitt Peak || Spacewatch ||  || align=right | 2.2 km || 
|-id=576 bgcolor=#E9E9E9
| 504576 ||  || — || September 23, 2008 || Kitt Peak || Spacewatch ||  || align=right | 1.6 km || 
|-id=577 bgcolor=#E9E9E9
| 504577 ||  || — || September 25, 2008 || Kitt Peak || Spacewatch ||  || align=right | 1.4 km || 
|-id=578 bgcolor=#E9E9E9
| 504578 ||  || — || October 6, 2008 || Mount Lemmon || Mount Lemmon Survey ||  || align=right | 1.1 km || 
|-id=579 bgcolor=#d6d6d6
| 504579 ||  || — || October 6, 2008 || Mount Lemmon || Mount Lemmon Survey || 3:2 || align=right | 4.0 km || 
|-id=580 bgcolor=#E9E9E9
| 504580 ||  || — || October 6, 2008 || Mount Lemmon || Mount Lemmon Survey || (1547) || align=right | 1.2 km || 
|-id=581 bgcolor=#E9E9E9
| 504581 ||  || — || September 23, 2008 || Kitt Peak || Spacewatch ||  || align=right | 2.3 km || 
|-id=582 bgcolor=#E9E9E9
| 504582 ||  || — || October 8, 2008 || Mount Lemmon || Mount Lemmon Survey || GEF || align=right data-sort-value="0.87" | 870 m || 
|-id=583 bgcolor=#E9E9E9
| 504583 ||  || — || October 9, 2008 || Kitt Peak || Spacewatch ||  || align=right data-sort-value="0.99" | 990 m || 
|-id=584 bgcolor=#E9E9E9
| 504584 ||  || — || October 3, 2008 || La Sagra || OAM Obs. ||  || align=right | 1.7 km || 
|-id=585 bgcolor=#E9E9E9
| 504585 ||  || — || October 9, 2008 || Kitt Peak || Spacewatch || DOR || align=right | 1.9 km || 
|-id=586 bgcolor=#E9E9E9
| 504586 ||  || — || October 2, 2008 || Kitt Peak || Spacewatch ||  || align=right | 1.8 km || 
|-id=587 bgcolor=#E9E9E9
| 504587 ||  || — || October 17, 2008 || Kitt Peak || Spacewatch ||  || align=right | 1.6 km || 
|-id=588 bgcolor=#E9E9E9
| 504588 ||  || — || September 22, 2008 || Mount Lemmon || Mount Lemmon Survey ||  || align=right | 1.7 km || 
|-id=589 bgcolor=#E9E9E9
| 504589 ||  || — || October 20, 2008 || Kitt Peak || Spacewatch || WIT || align=right data-sort-value="0.82" | 820 m || 
|-id=590 bgcolor=#E9E9E9
| 504590 ||  || — || September 25, 2008 || Kitt Peak || Spacewatch ||  || align=right | 1.8 km || 
|-id=591 bgcolor=#E9E9E9
| 504591 ||  || — || October 21, 2008 || Kitt Peak || Spacewatch ||  || align=right | 1.3 km || 
|-id=592 bgcolor=#E9E9E9
| 504592 ||  || — || October 21, 2008 || Kitt Peak || Spacewatch ||  || align=right | 2.3 km || 
|-id=593 bgcolor=#E9E9E9
| 504593 ||  || — || October 21, 2008 || Kitt Peak || Spacewatch ||  || align=right | 1.6 km || 
|-id=594 bgcolor=#E9E9E9
| 504594 ||  || — || October 21, 2008 || Kitt Peak || Spacewatch ||  || align=right | 2.7 km || 
|-id=595 bgcolor=#E9E9E9
| 504595 ||  || — || October 22, 2008 || Kitt Peak || Spacewatch ||  || align=right | 2.5 km || 
|-id=596 bgcolor=#E9E9E9
| 504596 ||  || — || October 21, 2008 || Kitt Peak || Spacewatch || JUN || align=right data-sort-value="0.92" | 920 m || 
|-id=597 bgcolor=#E9E9E9
| 504597 ||  || — || October 22, 2008 || Kitt Peak || Spacewatch ||  || align=right | 1.8 km || 
|-id=598 bgcolor=#E9E9E9
| 504598 ||  || — || October 22, 2008 || Kitt Peak || Spacewatch || AEO || align=right data-sort-value="0.91" | 910 m || 
|-id=599 bgcolor=#E9E9E9
| 504599 ||  || — || October 22, 2008 || Kitt Peak || Spacewatch || WIT || align=right data-sort-value="0.83" | 830 m || 
|-id=600 bgcolor=#E9E9E9
| 504600 ||  || — || October 22, 2008 || Kitt Peak || Spacewatch ||  || align=right | 2.0 km || 
|}

504601–504700 

|-bgcolor=#E9E9E9
| 504601 ||  || — || October 22, 2008 || Kitt Peak || Spacewatch || AGN || align=right | 1.00 km || 
|-id=602 bgcolor=#E9E9E9
| 504602 ||  || — || September 6, 2008 || Mount Lemmon || Mount Lemmon Survey ||  || align=right | 1.8 km || 
|-id=603 bgcolor=#E9E9E9
| 504603 ||  || — || October 29, 1999 || Kitt Peak || Spacewatch ||  || align=right | 1.9 km || 
|-id=604 bgcolor=#E9E9E9
| 504604 ||  || — || October 23, 2008 || Kitt Peak || Spacewatch ||  || align=right | 1.4 km || 
|-id=605 bgcolor=#E9E9E9
| 504605 ||  || — || October 23, 2008 || Kitt Peak || Spacewatch ||  || align=right | 1.7 km || 
|-id=606 bgcolor=#E9E9E9
| 504606 ||  || — || October 23, 2008 || Mount Lemmon || Mount Lemmon Survey ||  || align=right | 1.7 km || 
|-id=607 bgcolor=#E9E9E9
| 504607 ||  || — || October 23, 2008 || Kitt Peak || Spacewatch ||  || align=right | 2.1 km || 
|-id=608 bgcolor=#E9E9E9
| 504608 ||  || — || October 23, 2008 || Kitt Peak || Spacewatch ||  || align=right | 1.6 km || 
|-id=609 bgcolor=#E9E9E9
| 504609 ||  || — || October 24, 2008 || Kitt Peak || Spacewatch ||  || align=right | 1.6 km || 
|-id=610 bgcolor=#E9E9E9
| 504610 ||  || — || October 25, 2008 || Kitt Peak || Spacewatch ||  || align=right | 1.8 km || 
|-id=611 bgcolor=#E9E9E9
| 504611 ||  || — || October 6, 2008 || Mount Lemmon || Mount Lemmon Survey ||  || align=right | 1.6 km || 
|-id=612 bgcolor=#E9E9E9
| 504612 ||  || — || October 26, 2008 || Kitt Peak || Spacewatch ||  || align=right | 1.9 km || 
|-id=613 bgcolor=#E9E9E9
| 504613 ||  || — || October 27, 2008 || Kitt Peak || Spacewatch ||  || align=right | 1.5 km || 
|-id=614 bgcolor=#E9E9E9
| 504614 ||  || — || October 28, 2008 || Kitt Peak || Spacewatch ||  || align=right | 1.9 km || 
|-id=615 bgcolor=#E9E9E9
| 504615 ||  || — || October 20, 2008 || Kitt Peak || Spacewatch ||  || align=right | 1.7 km || 
|-id=616 bgcolor=#E9E9E9
| 504616 ||  || — || October 28, 2008 || Mount Lemmon || Mount Lemmon Survey ||  || align=right | 1.7 km || 
|-id=617 bgcolor=#E9E9E9
| 504617 ||  || — || October 25, 2008 || Mount Lemmon || Mount Lemmon Survey || HOF || align=right | 2.1 km || 
|-id=618 bgcolor=#E9E9E9
| 504618 ||  || — || October 10, 2008 || Mount Lemmon || Mount Lemmon Survey ||  || align=right | 2.3 km || 
|-id=619 bgcolor=#E9E9E9
| 504619 ||  || — || October 30, 2008 || Mount Lemmon || Mount Lemmon Survey ||  || align=right | 2.7 km || 
|-id=620 bgcolor=#E9E9E9
| 504620 ||  || — || September 24, 2008 || Catalina || CSS ||  || align=right | 2.5 km || 
|-id=621 bgcolor=#E9E9E9
| 504621 ||  || — || October 31, 2008 || Catalina || CSS ||  || align=right | 2.0 km || 
|-id=622 bgcolor=#E9E9E9
| 504622 ||  || — || October 28, 2008 || Mount Lemmon || Mount Lemmon Survey ||  || align=right | 1.5 km || 
|-id=623 bgcolor=#E9E9E9
| 504623 ||  || — || October 22, 2008 || Kitt Peak || Spacewatch ||  || align=right | 1.8 km || 
|-id=624 bgcolor=#E9E9E9
| 504624 ||  || — || October 20, 2008 || Kitt Peak || Spacewatch ||  || align=right | 2.0 km || 
|-id=625 bgcolor=#E9E9E9
| 504625 ||  || — || October 24, 2008 || Catalina || CSS ||  || align=right | 1.8 km || 
|-id=626 bgcolor=#E9E9E9
| 504626 ||  || — || October 26, 2008 || Mount Lemmon || Mount Lemmon Survey ||  || align=right | 2.3 km || 
|-id=627 bgcolor=#E9E9E9
| 504627 ||  || — || October 25, 2008 || Kitt Peak || Spacewatch || AGN || align=right data-sort-value="0.90" | 900 m || 
|-id=628 bgcolor=#E9E9E9
| 504628 ||  || — || November 2, 2008 || Mount Lemmon || Mount Lemmon Survey ||  || align=right | 2.8 km || 
|-id=629 bgcolor=#E9E9E9
| 504629 ||  || — || September 29, 2008 || Kitt Peak || Spacewatch ||  || align=right | 1.8 km || 
|-id=630 bgcolor=#E9E9E9
| 504630 ||  || — || October 26, 2008 || Kitt Peak || Spacewatch ||  || align=right | 1.6 km || 
|-id=631 bgcolor=#E9E9E9
| 504631 ||  || — || November 6, 2008 || Mount Lemmon || Mount Lemmon Survey ||  || align=right | 2.2 km || 
|-id=632 bgcolor=#E9E9E9
| 504632 ||  || — || October 31, 2008 || Kitt Peak || Spacewatch ||  || align=right | 1.9 km || 
|-id=633 bgcolor=#E9E9E9
| 504633 ||  || — || September 29, 2008 || Mount Lemmon || Mount Lemmon Survey ||  || align=right | 1.6 km || 
|-id=634 bgcolor=#E9E9E9
| 504634 ||  || — || November 17, 2008 || Kitt Peak || Spacewatch ||  || align=right | 1.6 km || 
|-id=635 bgcolor=#E9E9E9
| 504635 ||  || — || September 23, 2008 || Mount Lemmon || Mount Lemmon Survey ||  || align=right | 1.9 km || 
|-id=636 bgcolor=#E9E9E9
| 504636 ||  || — || September 7, 2008 || Mount Lemmon || Mount Lemmon Survey ||  || align=right | 2.2 km || 
|-id=637 bgcolor=#E9E9E9
| 504637 ||  || — || November 7, 2008 || Mount Lemmon || Mount Lemmon Survey ||  || align=right | 1.8 km || 
|-id=638 bgcolor=#E9E9E9
| 504638 ||  || — || November 2, 2008 || Mount Lemmon || Mount Lemmon Survey ||  || align=right | 2.6 km || 
|-id=639 bgcolor=#E9E9E9
| 504639 ||  || — || November 30, 2008 || Kitt Peak || Spacewatch || AGN || align=right | 1.0 km || 
|-id=640 bgcolor=#E9E9E9
| 504640 ||  || — || November 17, 2008 || Kitt Peak || Spacewatch ||  || align=right | 1.9 km || 
|-id=641 bgcolor=#E9E9E9
| 504641 ||  || — || November 21, 2008 || Kitt Peak || Spacewatch || AST || align=right | 1.5 km || 
|-id=642 bgcolor=#E9E9E9
| 504642 ||  || — || November 18, 2008 || Kitt Peak || Spacewatch ||  || align=right | 1.9 km || 
|-id=643 bgcolor=#E9E9E9
| 504643 ||  || — || September 27, 2008 || Mount Lemmon || Mount Lemmon Survey ||  || align=right | 1.4 km || 
|-id=644 bgcolor=#E9E9E9
| 504644 ||  || — || November 19, 2008 || Kitt Peak || Spacewatch ||  || align=right | 2.8 km || 
|-id=645 bgcolor=#E9E9E9
| 504645 ||  || — || October 3, 2008 || Mount Lemmon || Mount Lemmon Survey || AEO || align=right data-sort-value="0.95" | 950 m || 
|-id=646 bgcolor=#E9E9E9
| 504646 ||  || — || October 29, 2008 || Kitt Peak || Spacewatch ||  || align=right | 1.8 km || 
|-id=647 bgcolor=#d6d6d6
| 504647 ||  || — || December 2, 2008 || Kitt Peak || Spacewatch ||  || align=right | 2.1 km || 
|-id=648 bgcolor=#E9E9E9
| 504648 ||  || — || September 29, 2008 || Mount Lemmon || Mount Lemmon Survey ||  || align=right | 1.4 km || 
|-id=649 bgcolor=#d6d6d6
| 504649 ||  || — || December 29, 2008 || Mount Lemmon || Mount Lemmon Survey ||  || align=right | 2.8 km || 
|-id=650 bgcolor=#fefefe
| 504650 ||  || — || December 29, 2008 || Kitt Peak || Spacewatch ||  || align=right data-sort-value="0.45" | 450 m || 
|-id=651 bgcolor=#d6d6d6
| 504651 ||  || — || December 22, 2008 || Mount Lemmon || Mount Lemmon Survey ||  || align=right | 2.6 km || 
|-id=652 bgcolor=#d6d6d6
| 504652 ||  || — || December 22, 2008 || Kitt Peak || Spacewatch ||  || align=right | 2.1 km || 
|-id=653 bgcolor=#d6d6d6
| 504653 ||  || — || December 29, 2008 || Kitt Peak || Spacewatch ||  || align=right | 2.0 km || 
|-id=654 bgcolor=#d6d6d6
| 504654 ||  || — || December 22, 2008 || Kitt Peak || Spacewatch ||  || align=right | 4.1 km || 
|-id=655 bgcolor=#d6d6d6
| 504655 ||  || — || December 30, 2008 || Mount Lemmon || Mount Lemmon Survey || KOR || align=right | 1.1 km || 
|-id=656 bgcolor=#d6d6d6
| 504656 ||  || — || December 30, 2008 || Mount Lemmon || Mount Lemmon Survey ||  || align=right | 2.9 km || 
|-id=657 bgcolor=#d6d6d6
| 504657 ||  || — || November 1, 2008 || Mount Lemmon || Mount Lemmon Survey ||  || align=right | 2.8 km || 
|-id=658 bgcolor=#d6d6d6
| 504658 ||  || — || December 21, 2008 || Kitt Peak || Spacewatch ||  || align=right | 2.2 km || 
|-id=659 bgcolor=#d6d6d6
| 504659 ||  || — || December 22, 2008 || Kitt Peak || Spacewatch || NAE || align=right | 2.5 km || 
|-id=660 bgcolor=#fefefe
| 504660 ||  || — || January 15, 2009 || Kitt Peak || Spacewatch ||  || align=right data-sort-value="0.77" | 770 m || 
|-id=661 bgcolor=#d6d6d6
| 504661 ||  || — || December 21, 2008 || Kitt Peak || Spacewatch ||  || align=right | 2.3 km || 
|-id=662 bgcolor=#d6d6d6
| 504662 ||  || — || December 30, 2008 || Kitt Peak || Spacewatch ||  || align=right | 1.6 km || 
|-id=663 bgcolor=#d6d6d6
| 504663 ||  || — || January 2, 2009 || Kitt Peak || Spacewatch ||  || align=right | 2.5 km || 
|-id=664 bgcolor=#d6d6d6
| 504664 ||  || — || December 22, 2008 || Kitt Peak || Spacewatch ||  || align=right | 1.9 km || 
|-id=665 bgcolor=#fefefe
| 504665 ||  || — || January 3, 2009 || Mount Lemmon || Mount Lemmon Survey ||  || align=right data-sort-value="0.74" | 740 m || 
|-id=666 bgcolor=#fefefe
| 504666 ||  || — || January 15, 2009 || Kitt Peak || Spacewatch ||  || align=right data-sort-value="0.74" | 740 m || 
|-id=667 bgcolor=#d6d6d6
| 504667 ||  || — || January 31, 2009 || Kitt Peak || Spacewatch || KOR || align=right | 1.3 km || 
|-id=668 bgcolor=#fefefe
| 504668 ||  || — || January 30, 2009 || Mount Lemmon || Mount Lemmon Survey ||  || align=right data-sort-value="0.78" | 780 m || 
|-id=669 bgcolor=#d6d6d6
| 504669 ||  || — || January 17, 2009 || Kitt Peak || Spacewatch || TIR || align=right | 3.0 km || 
|-id=670 bgcolor=#d6d6d6
| 504670 ||  || — || January 25, 2009 || Kitt Peak || Spacewatch ||  || align=right | 2.2 km || 
|-id=671 bgcolor=#d6d6d6
| 504671 ||  || — || February 1, 2009 || Kitt Peak || Spacewatch ||  || align=right | 2.4 km || 
|-id=672 bgcolor=#d6d6d6
| 504672 ||  || — || January 20, 2009 || Mount Lemmon || Mount Lemmon Survey ||  || align=right | 2.6 km || 
|-id=673 bgcolor=#d6d6d6
| 504673 ||  || — || January 15, 2009 || Kitt Peak || Spacewatch ||  || align=right | 2.6 km || 
|-id=674 bgcolor=#d6d6d6
| 504674 ||  || — || December 3, 2008 || Mount Lemmon || Mount Lemmon Survey ||  || align=right | 2.0 km || 
|-id=675 bgcolor=#fefefe
| 504675 ||  || — || February 19, 2009 || Kitt Peak || Spacewatch ||  || align=right data-sort-value="0.72" | 720 m || 
|-id=676 bgcolor=#fefefe
| 504676 ||  || — || February 17, 2009 || La Sagra || OAM Obs. ||  || align=right data-sort-value="0.68" | 680 m || 
|-id=677 bgcolor=#fefefe
| 504677 ||  || — || January 17, 2009 || Kitt Peak || Spacewatch ||  || align=right data-sort-value="0.61" | 610 m || 
|-id=678 bgcolor=#d6d6d6
| 504678 ||  || — || January 25, 2009 || Kitt Peak || Spacewatch ||  || align=right | 3.5 km || 
|-id=679 bgcolor=#d6d6d6
| 504679 ||  || — || January 29, 2009 || Mount Lemmon || Mount Lemmon Survey ||  || align=right | 2.7 km || 
|-id=680 bgcolor=#FFC2E0
| 504680 ||  || — || March 5, 2009 || Siding Spring || SSS || APOPHAcritical || align=right data-sort-value="0.39" | 390 m || 
|-id=681 bgcolor=#d6d6d6
| 504681 ||  || — || March 17, 2009 || Kitt Peak || Spacewatch ||  || align=right | 2.3 km || 
|-id=682 bgcolor=#d6d6d6
| 504682 ||  || — || March 16, 2009 || Kitt Peak || Spacewatch || EOS || align=right | 2.2 km || 
|-id=683 bgcolor=#fefefe
| 504683 ||  || — || March 17, 2009 || Kitt Peak || Spacewatch ||  || align=right data-sort-value="0.52" | 520 m || 
|-id=684 bgcolor=#d6d6d6
| 504684 ||  || — || March 1, 2009 || Kitt Peak || Spacewatch || EOS || align=right | 1.8 km || 
|-id=685 bgcolor=#d6d6d6
| 504685 ||  || — || December 29, 2008 || Mount Lemmon || Mount Lemmon Survey ||  || align=right | 3.5 km || 
|-id=686 bgcolor=#d6d6d6
| 504686 ||  || — || March 3, 2009 || Kitt Peak || Spacewatch ||  || align=right | 2.5 km || 
|-id=687 bgcolor=#d6d6d6
| 504687 ||  || — || March 18, 2009 || Kitt Peak || Spacewatch ||  || align=right | 2.5 km || 
|-id=688 bgcolor=#d6d6d6
| 504688 ||  || — || March 16, 2009 || Kitt Peak || Spacewatch ||  || align=right | 3.3 km || 
|-id=689 bgcolor=#fefefe
| 504689 ||  || — || March 18, 2009 || Kitt Peak || Spacewatch ||  || align=right data-sort-value="0.81" | 810 m || 
|-id=690 bgcolor=#d6d6d6
| 504690 ||  || — || April 20, 2009 || Kitt Peak || Spacewatch ||  || align=right | 2.2 km || 
|-id=691 bgcolor=#fefefe
| 504691 ||  || — || March 17, 2009 || Kitt Peak || Spacewatch ||  || align=right data-sort-value="0.57" | 570 m || 
|-id=692 bgcolor=#fefefe
| 504692 ||  || — || April 23, 2009 || Kitt Peak || Spacewatch ||  || align=right data-sort-value="0.64" | 640 m || 
|-id=693 bgcolor=#fefefe
| 504693 ||  || — || April 18, 2009 || Mount Lemmon || Mount Lemmon Survey || H || align=right data-sort-value="0.63" | 630 m || 
|-id=694 bgcolor=#d6d6d6
| 504694 ||  || — || April 29, 2009 || Kitt Peak || Spacewatch ||  || align=right | 2.2 km || 
|-id=695 bgcolor=#fefefe
| 504695 ||  || — || April 26, 2009 || Kitt Peak || Spacewatch ||  || align=right data-sort-value="0.65" | 650 m || 
|-id=696 bgcolor=#fefefe
| 504696 ||  || — || April 22, 2009 || Mount Lemmon || Mount Lemmon Survey ||  || align=right data-sort-value="0.77" | 770 m || 
|-id=697 bgcolor=#d6d6d6
| 504697 ||  || — || April 30, 2009 || Kitt Peak || Spacewatch ||  || align=right | 2.2 km || 
|-id=698 bgcolor=#fefefe
| 504698 ||  || — || May 13, 2009 || Kitt Peak || Spacewatch ||  || align=right data-sort-value="0.83" | 830 m || 
|-id=699 bgcolor=#d6d6d6
| 504699 ||  || — || May 29, 2009 || Mount Lemmon || Mount Lemmon Survey ||  || align=right | 3.2 km || 
|-id=700 bgcolor=#fefefe
| 504700 ||  || — || June 30, 2009 || Mount Lemmon || Mount Lemmon Survey || NYS || align=right data-sort-value="0.54" | 540 m || 
|}

504701–504800 

|-bgcolor=#fefefe
| 504701 ||  || — || August 15, 2009 || Kitt Peak || Spacewatch || V || align=right data-sort-value="0.63" | 630 m || 
|-id=702 bgcolor=#FA8072
| 504702 ||  || — || July 14, 2009 || Kitt Peak || Spacewatch || H || align=right data-sort-value="0.66" | 660 m || 
|-id=703 bgcolor=#fefefe
| 504703 ||  || — || September 12, 2009 || Kitt Peak || Spacewatch || H || align=right data-sort-value="0.69" | 690 m || 
|-id=704 bgcolor=#fefefe
| 504704 ||  || — || September 15, 2009 || Kitt Peak || Spacewatch ||  || align=right data-sort-value="0.96" | 960 m || 
|-id=705 bgcolor=#E9E9E9
| 504705 ||  || — || September 15, 2009 || Kitt Peak || Spacewatch ||  || align=right data-sort-value="0.79" | 790 m || 
|-id=706 bgcolor=#fefefe
| 504706 ||  || — || September 22, 2009 || Altschwendt || W. Ries ||  || align=right data-sort-value="0.55" | 550 m || 
|-id=707 bgcolor=#E9E9E9
| 504707 ||  || — || September 16, 2009 || Kitt Peak || Spacewatch ||  || align=right | 1.1 km || 
|-id=708 bgcolor=#fefefe
| 504708 ||  || — || September 17, 2009 || Kitt Peak || Spacewatch || H || align=right data-sort-value="0.56" | 560 m || 
|-id=709 bgcolor=#fefefe
| 504709 ||  || — || August 20, 2009 || La Sagra || OAM Obs. || MAS || align=right data-sort-value="0.78" | 780 m || 
|-id=710 bgcolor=#fefefe
| 504710 ||  || — || August 20, 2009 || Kitt Peak || Spacewatch ||  || align=right data-sort-value="0.80" | 800 m || 
|-id=711 bgcolor=#FFC2E0
| 504711 ||  || — || September 28, 2009 || Mount Lemmon || Mount Lemmon Survey || APO || align=right data-sort-value="0.49" | 490 m || 
|-id=712 bgcolor=#E9E9E9
| 504712 ||  || — || September 21, 2009 || Kitt Peak || Spacewatch ||  || align=right data-sort-value="0.79" | 790 m || 
|-id=713 bgcolor=#fefefe
| 504713 ||  || — || September 21, 2009 || Mount Lemmon || Mount Lemmon Survey ||  || align=right data-sort-value="0.56" | 560 m || 
|-id=714 bgcolor=#fefefe
| 504714 ||  || — || September 25, 2009 || Kitt Peak || Spacewatch ||  || align=right data-sort-value="0.73" | 730 m || 
|-id=715 bgcolor=#E9E9E9
| 504715 ||  || — || September 29, 2009 || Kitt Peak || Spacewatch ||  || align=right data-sort-value="0.85" | 850 m || 
|-id=716 bgcolor=#fefefe
| 504716 ||  || — || August 27, 2009 || Kitt Peak || Spacewatch ||  || align=right data-sort-value="0.77" | 770 m || 
|-id=717 bgcolor=#E9E9E9
| 504717 ||  || — || October 15, 2009 || La Sagra || OAM Obs. ||  || align=right | 2.4 km || 
|-id=718 bgcolor=#d6d6d6
| 504718 ||  || — || December 4, 2011 || Haleakala || Pan-STARRS || 3:2 || align=right | 4.9 km || 
|-id=719 bgcolor=#fefefe
| 504719 ||  || — || September 29, 2009 || Mount Lemmon || Mount Lemmon Survey ||  || align=right data-sort-value="0.80" | 800 m || 
|-id=720 bgcolor=#E9E9E9
| 504720 ||  || — || October 18, 2009 || Mount Lemmon || Mount Lemmon Survey ||  || align=right | 1.3 km || 
|-id=721 bgcolor=#E9E9E9
| 504721 ||  || — || October 21, 2009 || Mount Lemmon || Mount Lemmon Survey ||  || align=right | 1.9 km || 
|-id=722 bgcolor=#E9E9E9
| 504722 ||  || — || October 28, 2005 || Mount Lemmon || Mount Lemmon Survey ||  || align=right data-sort-value="0.63" | 630 m || 
|-id=723 bgcolor=#E9E9E9
| 504723 ||  || — || October 14, 2009 || Catalina || CSS ||  || align=right | 1.2 km || 
|-id=724 bgcolor=#E9E9E9
| 504724 ||  || — || October 23, 2009 || Kitt Peak || Spacewatch ||  || align=right data-sort-value="0.95" | 950 m || 
|-id=725 bgcolor=#E9E9E9
| 504725 ||  || — || October 28, 2009 || Bisei SG Center || BATTeRS ||  || align=right data-sort-value="0.64" | 640 m || 
|-id=726 bgcolor=#E9E9E9
| 504726 ||  || — || October 26, 2009 || Mount Lemmon || Mount Lemmon Survey || HNS || align=right data-sort-value="0.93" | 930 m || 
|-id=727 bgcolor=#E9E9E9
| 504727 ||  || — || October 18, 2009 || Mount Lemmon || Mount Lemmon Survey ||  || align=right data-sort-value="0.48" | 480 m || 
|-id=728 bgcolor=#E9E9E9
| 504728 ||  || — || October 24, 2009 || Kitt Peak || Spacewatch ||  || align=right data-sort-value="0.40" | 400 m || 
|-id=729 bgcolor=#fefefe
| 504729 ||  || — || October 18, 2009 || Mount Lemmon || Mount Lemmon Survey || H || align=right data-sort-value="0.71" | 710 m || 
|-id=730 bgcolor=#E9E9E9
| 504730 ||  || — || November 9, 2009 || Mount Lemmon || Mount Lemmon Survey ||  || align=right | 1.0 km || 
|-id=731 bgcolor=#E9E9E9
| 504731 ||  || — || October 22, 2009 || Mount Lemmon || Mount Lemmon Survey || BAR || align=right | 1.2 km || 
|-id=732 bgcolor=#E9E9E9
| 504732 ||  || — || November 10, 2009 || La Sagra || OAM Obs. ||  || align=right | 2.9 km || 
|-id=733 bgcolor=#fefefe
| 504733 ||  || — || October 2, 2009 || Mount Lemmon || Mount Lemmon Survey || H || align=right data-sort-value="0.70" | 700 m || 
|-id=734 bgcolor=#E9E9E9
| 504734 ||  || — || November 9, 2009 || Kitt Peak || Spacewatch || EUN || align=right data-sort-value="0.79" | 790 m || 
|-id=735 bgcolor=#E9E9E9
| 504735 ||  || — || October 16, 2009 || Mount Lemmon || Mount Lemmon Survey || MAR || align=right data-sort-value="0.99" | 990 m || 
|-id=736 bgcolor=#E9E9E9
| 504736 ||  || — || November 9, 2009 || Mount Lemmon || Mount Lemmon Survey ||  || align=right data-sort-value="0.96" | 960 m || 
|-id=737 bgcolor=#E9E9E9
| 504737 ||  || — || November 9, 2009 || Mount Lemmon || Mount Lemmon Survey ||  || align=right data-sort-value="0.67" | 670 m || 
|-id=738 bgcolor=#d6d6d6
| 504738 ||  || — || March 26, 2004 || Kitt Peak || Spacewatch || 3:2 || align=right | 3.8 km || 
|-id=739 bgcolor=#E9E9E9
| 504739 ||  || — || October 11, 2009 || Mount Lemmon || Mount Lemmon Survey ||  || align=right data-sort-value="0.63" | 630 m || 
|-id=740 bgcolor=#E9E9E9
| 504740 ||  || — || November 9, 2009 || Kitt Peak || Spacewatch ||  || align=right data-sort-value="0.71" | 710 m || 
|-id=741 bgcolor=#E9E9E9
| 504741 ||  || — || October 15, 2009 || Catalina || CSS || BAR || align=right | 1.2 km || 
|-id=742 bgcolor=#E9E9E9
| 504742 ||  || — || October 27, 2009 || XuYi || PMO NEO || EUN || align=right | 1.4 km || 
|-id=743 bgcolor=#E9E9E9
| 504743 ||  || — || November 11, 2009 || Kitt Peak || Spacewatch ||  || align=right | 1.5 km || 
|-id=744 bgcolor=#E9E9E9
| 504744 ||  || — || September 30, 2009 || Mount Lemmon || Mount Lemmon Survey ||  || align=right | 1.3 km || 
|-id=745 bgcolor=#E9E9E9
| 504745 ||  || — || November 10, 2009 || Kitt Peak || Spacewatch ||  || align=right | 2.3 km || 
|-id=746 bgcolor=#E9E9E9
| 504746 ||  || — || November 21, 2009 || Mount Lemmon || Mount Lemmon Survey ||  || align=right | 1.4 km || 
|-id=747 bgcolor=#E9E9E9
| 504747 ||  || — || November 16, 2009 || Kitt Peak || Spacewatch ||  || align=right data-sort-value="0.91" | 910 m || 
|-id=748 bgcolor=#E9E9E9
| 504748 ||  || — || November 20, 2009 || Kitt Peak || Spacewatch ||  || align=right data-sort-value="0.67" | 670 m || 
|-id=749 bgcolor=#E9E9E9
| 504749 ||  || — || December 10, 2005 || Kitt Peak || Spacewatch ||  || align=right | 1.0 km || 
|-id=750 bgcolor=#E9E9E9
| 504750 ||  || — || November 11, 2009 || Mount Lemmon || Mount Lemmon Survey ||  || align=right data-sort-value="0.98" | 980 m || 
|-id=751 bgcolor=#E9E9E9
| 504751 ||  || — || November 20, 2009 || Kitt Peak || Spacewatch ||  || align=right | 1.9 km || 
|-id=752 bgcolor=#E9E9E9
| 504752 ||  || — || November 16, 2009 || Mount Lemmon || Mount Lemmon Survey ||  || align=right data-sort-value="0.59" | 590 m || 
|-id=753 bgcolor=#fefefe
| 504753 ||  || — || October 24, 2009 || Mount Lemmon || Mount Lemmon Survey || H || align=right data-sort-value="0.61" | 610 m || 
|-id=754 bgcolor=#E9E9E9
| 504754 ||  || — || November 17, 2009 || Mount Lemmon || Mount Lemmon Survey || MAR || align=right data-sort-value="0.94" | 940 m || 
|-id=755 bgcolor=#E9E9E9
| 504755 ||  || — || November 9, 2009 || Mount Lemmon || Mount Lemmon Survey || MAR || align=right data-sort-value="0.98" | 980 m || 
|-id=756 bgcolor=#E9E9E9
| 504756 ||  || — || November 18, 2009 || Kitt Peak || Spacewatch ||  || align=right | 2.7 km || 
|-id=757 bgcolor=#E9E9E9
| 504757 ||  || — || October 21, 2009 || Mount Lemmon || Mount Lemmon Survey ||  || align=right | 2.2 km || 
|-id=758 bgcolor=#E9E9E9
| 504758 ||  || — || November 18, 2009 || Kitt Peak || Spacewatch ||  || align=right data-sort-value="0.93" | 930 m || 
|-id=759 bgcolor=#E9E9E9
| 504759 ||  || — || November 18, 2009 || Kitt Peak || Spacewatch || EUN || align=right | 1.4 km || 
|-id=760 bgcolor=#E9E9E9
| 504760 ||  || — || November 19, 2009 || Kitt Peak || Spacewatch ||  || align=right data-sort-value="0.96" | 960 m || 
|-id=761 bgcolor=#E9E9E9
| 504761 ||  || — || December 31, 2005 || Kitt Peak || Spacewatch ||  || align=right | 1.5 km || 
|-id=762 bgcolor=#E9E9E9
| 504762 ||  || — || November 19, 2009 || Mount Lemmon || Mount Lemmon Survey ||  || align=right data-sort-value="0.84" | 840 m || 
|-id=763 bgcolor=#E9E9E9
| 504763 ||  || — || September 28, 2009 || Mount Lemmon || Mount Lemmon Survey ||  || align=right data-sort-value="0.76" | 760 m || 
|-id=764 bgcolor=#E9E9E9
| 504764 ||  || — || November 22, 2009 || Mount Lemmon || Mount Lemmon Survey ||  || align=right data-sort-value="0.65" | 650 m || 
|-id=765 bgcolor=#E9E9E9
| 504765 ||  || — || November 18, 2009 || Mount Lemmon || Mount Lemmon Survey ||  || align=right | 1.8 km || 
|-id=766 bgcolor=#E9E9E9
| 504766 ||  || — || October 24, 2009 || Catalina || CSS ||  || align=right | 1.1 km || 
|-id=767 bgcolor=#fefefe
| 504767 ||  || — || October 1, 2009 || Mount Lemmon || Mount Lemmon Survey || H || align=right data-sort-value="0.74" | 740 m || 
|-id=768 bgcolor=#E9E9E9
| 504768 ||  || — || November 21, 2009 || Kitt Peak || Spacewatch ||  || align=right data-sort-value="0.70" | 700 m || 
|-id=769 bgcolor=#E9E9E9
| 504769 ||  || — || September 19, 2009 || Mount Lemmon || Mount Lemmon Survey ||  || align=right data-sort-value="0.93" | 930 m || 
|-id=770 bgcolor=#E9E9E9
| 504770 ||  || — || November 17, 2009 || Kitt Peak || Spacewatch ||  || align=right | 1.5 km || 
|-id=771 bgcolor=#E9E9E9
| 504771 ||  || — || November 17, 2009 || Kitt Peak || Spacewatch ||  || align=right data-sort-value="0.81" | 810 m || 
|-id=772 bgcolor=#E9E9E9
| 504772 ||  || — || November 10, 2009 || Kitt Peak || Spacewatch ||  || align=right | 1.1 km || 
|-id=773 bgcolor=#E9E9E9
| 504773 ||  || — || November 20, 2009 || Kitt Peak || Spacewatch ||  || align=right | 2.1 km || 
|-id=774 bgcolor=#E9E9E9
| 504774 ||  || — || November 25, 2009 || Kitt Peak || Spacewatch || HNS || align=right | 1.2 km || 
|-id=775 bgcolor=#E9E9E9
| 504775 ||  || — || August 28, 2009 || Kitt Peak || Spacewatch || HNS || align=right | 1.4 km || 
|-id=776 bgcolor=#fefefe
| 504776 ||  || — || October 1, 2009 || Kitt Peak || Spacewatch || H || align=right data-sort-value="0.64" | 640 m || 
|-id=777 bgcolor=#E9E9E9
| 504777 ||  || — || December 15, 2009 || Mount Lemmon || Mount Lemmon Survey || EUN || align=right | 1.1 km || 
|-id=778 bgcolor=#E9E9E9
| 504778 ||  || — || December 10, 2009 || Socorro || LINEAR ||  || align=right | 2.8 km || 
|-id=779 bgcolor=#E9E9E9
| 504779 ||  || — || December 17, 2009 || Mount Lemmon || Mount Lemmon Survey ||  || align=right | 1.7 km || 
|-id=780 bgcolor=#E9E9E9
| 504780 ||  || — || November 22, 2009 || Mount Lemmon || Mount Lemmon Survey ||  || align=right | 1.2 km || 
|-id=781 bgcolor=#E9E9E9
| 504781 ||  || — || November 20, 2009 || Mount Lemmon || Mount Lemmon Survey ||  || align=right data-sort-value="0.95" | 950 m || 
|-id=782 bgcolor=#E9E9E9
| 504782 ||  || — || December 18, 2009 || Mount Lemmon || Mount Lemmon Survey ||  || align=right | 2.2 km || 
|-id=783 bgcolor=#E9E9E9
| 504783 ||  || — || December 18, 2009 || Mount Lemmon || Mount Lemmon Survey ||  || align=right data-sort-value="0.74" | 740 m || 
|-id=784 bgcolor=#E9E9E9
| 504784 ||  || — || January 23, 2006 || Mount Lemmon || Mount Lemmon Survey ||  || align=right data-sort-value="0.85" | 850 m || 
|-id=785 bgcolor=#E9E9E9
| 504785 ||  || — || December 20, 2009 || Mount Lemmon || Mount Lemmon Survey ||  || align=right | 2.9 km || 
|-id=786 bgcolor=#E9E9E9
| 504786 ||  || — || January 6, 2010 || Kitt Peak || Spacewatch ||  || align=right | 1.2 km || 
|-id=787 bgcolor=#E9E9E9
| 504787 ||  || — || January 6, 2010 || Kitt Peak || Spacewatch || MIS || align=right | 2.0 km || 
|-id=788 bgcolor=#E9E9E9
| 504788 ||  || — || January 6, 2010 || Kitt Peak || Spacewatch ||  || align=right | 1.1 km || 
|-id=789 bgcolor=#E9E9E9
| 504789 ||  || — || September 24, 2008 || Mount Lemmon || Mount Lemmon Survey ||  || align=right | 1.5 km || 
|-id=790 bgcolor=#E9E9E9
| 504790 ||  || — || January 8, 2010 || Catalina || CSS ||  || align=right | 1.5 km || 
|-id=791 bgcolor=#E9E9E9
| 504791 ||  || — || December 18, 2009 || Mount Lemmon || Mount Lemmon Survey ||  || align=right | 1.5 km || 
|-id=792 bgcolor=#E9E9E9
| 504792 ||  || — || November 19, 2009 || Mount Lemmon || Mount Lemmon Survey ||  || align=right | 1.6 km || 
|-id=793 bgcolor=#E9E9E9
| 504793 ||  || — || September 24, 2008 || Mount Lemmon || Mount Lemmon Survey || EUN || align=right | 1.1 km || 
|-id=794 bgcolor=#E9E9E9
| 504794 ||  || — || January 26, 2006 || Mount Lemmon || Mount Lemmon Survey ||  || align=right | 1.1 km || 
|-id=795 bgcolor=#E9E9E9
| 504795 ||  || — || January 12, 2010 || Catalina || CSS ||  || align=right | 1.7 km || 
|-id=796 bgcolor=#E9E9E9
| 504796 ||  || — || January 6, 2010 || Catalina || CSS ||  || align=right data-sort-value="0.97" | 970 m || 
|-id=797 bgcolor=#E9E9E9
| 504797 ||  || — || January 6, 2010 || Kitt Peak || Spacewatch ||  || align=right | 1.5 km || 
|-id=798 bgcolor=#d6d6d6
| 504798 ||  || — || January 20, 2009 || Catalina || CSS ||  || align=right | 5.2 km || 
|-id=799 bgcolor=#d6d6d6
| 504799 ||  || — || September 10, 2001 || Socorro || LINEAR ||  || align=right | 4.9 km || 
|-id=800 bgcolor=#FFC2E0
| 504800 ||  || — || January 31, 2010 || WISE || WISE || APOPHA || align=right data-sort-value="0.38" | 380 m || 
|}

504801–504900 

|-bgcolor=#E9E9E9
| 504801 ||  || — || February 6, 2010 || Mount Lemmon || Mount Lemmon Survey ||  || align=right | 3.9 km || 
|-id=802 bgcolor=#E9E9E9
| 504802 ||  || — || January 15, 2010 || Kitt Peak || Spacewatch ||  || align=right | 1.2 km || 
|-id=803 bgcolor=#E9E9E9
| 504803 ||  || — || February 9, 2010 || Catalina || CSS ||  || align=right | 1.4 km || 
|-id=804 bgcolor=#E9E9E9
| 504804 ||  || — || February 9, 2010 || Catalina || CSS || (1547) || align=right | 1.3 km || 
|-id=805 bgcolor=#E9E9E9
| 504805 ||  || — || February 14, 2010 || Kitt Peak || Spacewatch ||  || align=right | 1.7 km || 
|-id=806 bgcolor=#E9E9E9
| 504806 ||  || — || January 11, 2010 || Kitt Peak || Spacewatch ||  || align=right | 2.5 km || 
|-id=807 bgcolor=#E9E9E9
| 504807 ||  || — || February 14, 2010 || Kitt Peak || Spacewatch ||  || align=right | 1.4 km || 
|-id=808 bgcolor=#E9E9E9
| 504808 ||  || — || February 15, 2010 || Kitt Peak || Spacewatch ||  || align=right | 1.3 km || 
|-id=809 bgcolor=#E9E9E9
| 504809 ||  || — || October 26, 2008 || Mount Lemmon || Mount Lemmon Survey ||  || align=right | 2.0 km || 
|-id=810 bgcolor=#d6d6d6
| 504810 ||  || — || February 15, 2010 || Haleakala || Pan-STARRS ||  || align=right | 2.8 km || 
|-id=811 bgcolor=#d6d6d6
| 504811 ||  || — || February 8, 2010 || WISE || WISE ||  || align=right | 4.1 km || 
|-id=812 bgcolor=#d6d6d6
| 504812 ||  || — || February 22, 2010 || WISE || WISE || EUP || align=right | 4.1 km || 
|-id=813 bgcolor=#E9E9E9
| 504813 ||  || — || February 19, 2010 || Kitt Peak || Spacewatch || GAL || align=right | 1.6 km || 
|-id=814 bgcolor=#E9E9E9
| 504814 ||  || — || January 12, 2010 || WISE || WISE ||  || align=right | 3.2 km || 
|-id=815 bgcolor=#E9E9E9
| 504815 ||  || — || February 15, 2010 || Catalina || CSS ||  || align=right | 1.6 km || 
|-id=816 bgcolor=#d6d6d6
| 504816 ||  || — || March 15, 2010 || Mount Lemmon || Mount Lemmon Survey ||  || align=right | 2.3 km || 
|-id=817 bgcolor=#E9E9E9
| 504817 ||  || — || March 16, 2010 || Mount Lemmon || Mount Lemmon Survey ||  || align=right | 3.6 km || 
|-id=818 bgcolor=#d6d6d6
| 504818 ||  || — || January 26, 2010 || WISE || WISE || Tj (2.97) || align=right | 3.3 km || 
|-id=819 bgcolor=#FA8072
| 504819 ||  || — || January 17, 2010 || WISE || WISE ||  || align=right data-sort-value="0.97" | 970 m || 
|-id=820 bgcolor=#d6d6d6
| 504820 ||  || — || April 15, 2010 || WISE || WISE || Tj (2.98) || align=right | 5.4 km || 
|-id=821 bgcolor=#E9E9E9
| 504821 ||  || — || March 13, 2010 || Kitt Peak || Spacewatch ||  || align=right | 1.3 km || 
|-id=822 bgcolor=#d6d6d6
| 504822 ||  || — || May 3, 2010 || Kitt Peak || Spacewatch ||  || align=right | 3.0 km || 
|-id=823 bgcolor=#E9E9E9
| 504823 ||  || — || September 24, 2008 || Kitt Peak || Spacewatch ||  || align=right | 2.5 km || 
|-id=824 bgcolor=#d6d6d6
| 504824 ||  || — || February 17, 2010 || WISE || WISE ||  || align=right | 3.3 km || 
|-id=825 bgcolor=#d6d6d6
| 504825 ||  || — || May 12, 2010 || Kitt Peak || Spacewatch ||  || align=right | 2.7 km || 
|-id=826 bgcolor=#d6d6d6
| 504826 ||  || — || May 17, 2010 || Kitt Peak || Spacewatch ||  || align=right | 2.7 km || 
|-id=827 bgcolor=#FFC2E0
| 504827 ||  || — || May 18, 2010 || WISE || WISE || AMOcritical || align=right data-sort-value="0.62" | 620 m || 
|-id=828 bgcolor=#d6d6d6
| 504828 ||  || — || March 1, 2009 || Kitt Peak || Spacewatch || EUP || align=right | 3.3 km || 
|-id=829 bgcolor=#d6d6d6
| 504829 ||  || — || December 2, 2005 || Kitt Peak || Spacewatch || 7:4 || align=right | 4.5 km || 
|-id=830 bgcolor=#fefefe
| 504830 ||  || — || June 18, 2010 || WISE || WISE ||  || align=right | 1.8 km || 
|-id=831 bgcolor=#fefefe
| 504831 ||  || — || June 26, 2010 || WISE || WISE ||  || align=right | 1.3 km || 
|-id=832 bgcolor=#fefefe
| 504832 ||  || — || July 3, 2010 || La Sagra || OAM Obs. ||  || align=right data-sort-value="0.75" | 750 m || 
|-id=833 bgcolor=#fefefe
| 504833 ||  || — || April 8, 2006 || Kitt Peak || Spacewatch ||  || align=right | 1.9 km || 
|-id=834 bgcolor=#d6d6d6
| 504834 ||  || — || January 16, 2010 || WISE || WISE ||  || align=right | 4.7 km || 
|-id=835 bgcolor=#fefefe
| 504835 ||  || — || July 19, 2010 || WISE || WISE ||  || align=right | 1.9 km || 
|-id=836 bgcolor=#d6d6d6
| 504836 ||  || — || February 8, 2010 || WISE || WISE ||  || align=right | 3.5 km || 
|-id=837 bgcolor=#fefefe
| 504837 ||  || — || September 4, 2010 || Kitt Peak || Spacewatch ||  || align=right data-sort-value="0.64" | 640 m || 
|-id=838 bgcolor=#fefefe
| 504838 ||  || — || September 2, 2010 || Mount Lemmon || Mount Lemmon Survey ||  || align=right data-sort-value="0.68" | 680 m || 
|-id=839 bgcolor=#fefefe
| 504839 ||  || — || September 6, 2010 || La Sagra || OAM Obs. ||  || align=right data-sort-value="0.71" | 710 m || 
|-id=840 bgcolor=#fefefe
| 504840 ||  || — || October 23, 2003 || Anderson Mesa || LONEOS ||  || align=right data-sort-value="0.71" | 710 m || 
|-id=841 bgcolor=#fefefe
| 504841 ||  || — || September 15, 2010 || Kitt Peak || Spacewatch ||  || align=right data-sort-value="0.68" | 680 m || 
|-id=842 bgcolor=#fefefe
| 504842 ||  || — || September 12, 2010 || WISE || WISE ||  || align=right | 3.5 km || 
|-id=843 bgcolor=#fefefe
| 504843 ||  || — || September 7, 2010 || La Sagra || OAM Obs. ||  || align=right data-sort-value="0.68" | 680 m || 
|-id=844 bgcolor=#fefefe
| 504844 ||  || — || September 7, 2010 || La Sagra || OAM Obs. ||  || align=right data-sort-value="0.80" | 800 m || 
|-id=845 bgcolor=#fefefe
| 504845 ||  || — || October 22, 2003 || Kitt Peak || Spacewatch ||  || align=right data-sort-value="0.47" | 470 m || 
|-id=846 bgcolor=#fefefe
| 504846 ||  || — || January 15, 2005 || Kitt Peak || Spacewatch ||  || align=right data-sort-value="0.74" | 740 m || 
|-id=847 bgcolor=#C2E0FF
| 504847 ||  || — || September 15, 2010 || Haleakala || Pan-STARRS || cubewano (hot) || align=right | 243 km || 
|-id=848 bgcolor=#FA8072
| 504848 ||  || — || October 21, 2003 || Kitt Peak || Spacewatch ||  || align=right data-sort-value="0.48" | 480 m || 
|-id=849 bgcolor=#fefefe
| 504849 ||  || — || September 16, 2010 || Kitt Peak || Spacewatch ||  || align=right data-sort-value="0.71" | 710 m || 
|-id=850 bgcolor=#fefefe
| 504850 ||  || — || September 17, 2010 || Mount Lemmon || Mount Lemmon Survey ||  || align=right data-sort-value="0.66" | 660 m || 
|-id=851 bgcolor=#fefefe
| 504851 ||  || — || September 4, 2010 || Kitt Peak || Spacewatch ||  || align=right data-sort-value="0.69" | 690 m || 
|-id=852 bgcolor=#fefefe
| 504852 ||  || — || September 15, 2010 || Kitt Peak || Spacewatch ||  || align=right data-sort-value="0.52" | 520 m || 
|-id=853 bgcolor=#fefefe
| 504853 ||  || — || August 6, 2010 || Kitt Peak || Spacewatch || (2076) || align=right data-sort-value="0.57" | 570 m || 
|-id=854 bgcolor=#fefefe
| 504854 ||  || — || September 10, 2010 || Kitt Peak || Spacewatch ||  || align=right data-sort-value="0.58" | 580 m || 
|-id=855 bgcolor=#fefefe
| 504855 ||  || — || September 16, 2010 || Kitt Peak || Spacewatch ||  || align=right data-sort-value="0.71" | 710 m || 
|-id=856 bgcolor=#fefefe
| 504856 ||  || — || October 11, 2010 || Mount Lemmon || Mount Lemmon Survey ||  || align=right data-sort-value="0.74" | 740 m || 
|-id=857 bgcolor=#FA8072
| 504857 ||  || — || September 18, 2010 || Mount Lemmon || Mount Lemmon Survey ||  || align=right data-sort-value="0.78" | 780 m || 
|-id=858 bgcolor=#fefefe
| 504858 ||  || — || October 16, 2003 || Kitt Peak || Spacewatch ||  || align=right data-sort-value="0.58" | 580 m || 
|-id=859 bgcolor=#fefefe
| 504859 ||  || — || October 1, 2010 || Catalina || CSS ||  || align=right data-sort-value="0.79" | 790 m || 
|-id=860 bgcolor=#fefefe
| 504860 ||  || — || September 19, 2003 || Kitt Peak || Spacewatch ||  || align=right data-sort-value="0.76" | 760 m || 
|-id=861 bgcolor=#fefefe
| 504861 ||  || — || November 29, 2003 || Kitt Peak || Spacewatch ||  || align=right data-sort-value="0.65" | 650 m || 
|-id=862 bgcolor=#fefefe
| 504862 ||  || — || March 21, 2009 || Mount Lemmon || Mount Lemmon Survey ||  || align=right data-sort-value="0.74" | 740 m || 
|-id=863 bgcolor=#fefefe
| 504863 ||  || — || October 17, 2010 || Mount Lemmon || Mount Lemmon Survey ||  || align=right data-sort-value="0.59" | 590 m || 
|-id=864 bgcolor=#fefefe
| 504864 ||  || — || September 11, 2010 || Mount Lemmon || Mount Lemmon Survey ||  || align=right data-sort-value="0.68" | 680 m || 
|-id=865 bgcolor=#fefefe
| 504865 ||  || — || November 29, 2003 || Kitt Peak || Spacewatch ||  || align=right data-sort-value="0.71" | 710 m || 
|-id=866 bgcolor=#fefefe
| 504866 ||  || — || October 12, 2010 || Mount Lemmon || Mount Lemmon Survey ||  || align=right data-sort-value="0.64" | 640 m || 
|-id=867 bgcolor=#fefefe
| 504867 ||  || — || October 30, 2010 || Kitt Peak || Spacewatch ||  || align=right data-sort-value="0.65" | 650 m || 
|-id=868 bgcolor=#fefefe
| 504868 ||  || — || July 21, 2010 || WISE || WISE ||  || align=right data-sort-value="0.71" | 710 m || 
|-id=869 bgcolor=#FA8072
| 504869 ||  || — || November 1, 2010 || Kitt Peak || Spacewatch ||  || align=right data-sort-value="0.73" | 730 m || 
|-id=870 bgcolor=#fefefe
| 504870 ||  || — || November 26, 2003 || Kitt Peak || Spacewatch ||  || align=right data-sort-value="0.53" | 530 m || 
|-id=871 bgcolor=#fefefe
| 504871 ||  || — || November 3, 2010 || Mount Lemmon || Mount Lemmon Survey ||  || align=right data-sort-value="0.71" | 710 m || 
|-id=872 bgcolor=#fefefe
| 504872 ||  || — || November 5, 2010 || La Sagra || OAM Obs. ||  || align=right data-sort-value="0.60" | 600 m || 
|-id=873 bgcolor=#fefefe
| 504873 ||  || — || January 15, 2004 || Kitt Peak || Spacewatch ||  || align=right data-sort-value="0.52" | 520 m || 
|-id=874 bgcolor=#fefefe
| 504874 ||  || — || November 3, 2010 || Mount Lemmon || Mount Lemmon Survey ||  || align=right data-sort-value="0.62" | 620 m || 
|-id=875 bgcolor=#fefefe
| 504875 ||  || — || November 3, 2010 || Mount Lemmon || Mount Lemmon Survey ||  || align=right data-sort-value="0.61" | 610 m || 
|-id=876 bgcolor=#fefefe
| 504876 ||  || — || November 29, 2003 || Kitt Peak || Spacewatch ||  || align=right data-sort-value="0.65" | 650 m || 
|-id=877 bgcolor=#fefefe
| 504877 ||  || — || September 24, 2006 || Anderson Mesa || LONEOS ||  || align=right data-sort-value="0.95" | 950 m || 
|-id=878 bgcolor=#fefefe
| 504878 ||  || — || October 22, 2003 || Kitt Peak || Spacewatch ||  || align=right data-sort-value="0.67" | 670 m || 
|-id=879 bgcolor=#fefefe
| 504879 ||  || — || November 5, 2010 || Kitt Peak || Spacewatch || V || align=right data-sort-value="0.51" | 510 m || 
|-id=880 bgcolor=#fefefe
| 504880 ||  || — || November 8, 2010 || Kitt Peak || Spacewatch ||  || align=right data-sort-value="0.66" | 660 m || 
|-id=881 bgcolor=#fefefe
| 504881 ||  || — || September 11, 2010 || Mount Lemmon || Mount Lemmon Survey ||  || align=right data-sort-value="0.73" | 730 m || 
|-id=882 bgcolor=#fefefe
| 504882 ||  || — || October 13, 2010 || Mount Lemmon || Mount Lemmon Survey || V || align=right data-sort-value="0.46" | 460 m || 
|-id=883 bgcolor=#fefefe
| 504883 ||  || — || November 10, 2010 || Mount Lemmon || Mount Lemmon Survey || V || align=right data-sort-value="0.43" | 430 m || 
|-id=884 bgcolor=#fefefe
| 504884 ||  || — || November 5, 2010 || Kitt Peak || Spacewatch ||  || align=right data-sort-value="0.63" | 630 m || 
|-id=885 bgcolor=#fefefe
| 504885 ||  || — || September 3, 2010 || Mount Lemmon || Mount Lemmon Survey ||  || align=right data-sort-value="0.69" | 690 m || 
|-id=886 bgcolor=#fefefe
| 504886 ||  || — || October 11, 2010 || Mount Lemmon || Mount Lemmon Survey ||  || align=right data-sort-value="0.66" | 660 m || 
|-id=887 bgcolor=#FFC2E0
| 504887 ||  || — || November 19, 2010 || Socorro || LINEAR || AMOcritical || align=right data-sort-value="0.39" | 390 m || 
|-id=888 bgcolor=#fefefe
| 504888 ||  || — || October 30, 2010 || Kitt Peak || Spacewatch || NYS || align=right data-sort-value="0.46" | 460 m || 
|-id=889 bgcolor=#fefefe
| 504889 ||  || — || July 25, 2006 || Mount Lemmon || Mount Lemmon Survey ||  || align=right data-sort-value="0.70" | 700 m || 
|-id=890 bgcolor=#fefefe
| 504890 ||  || — || November 1, 2010 || Kitt Peak || Spacewatch ||  || align=right data-sort-value="0.66" | 660 m || 
|-id=891 bgcolor=#fefefe
| 504891 ||  || — || September 5, 2010 || Mount Lemmon || Mount Lemmon Survey ||  || align=right data-sort-value="0.54" | 540 m || 
|-id=892 bgcolor=#fefefe
| 504892 ||  || — || November 11, 2010 || Kitt Peak || Spacewatch ||  || align=right data-sort-value="0.79" | 790 m || 
|-id=893 bgcolor=#fefefe
| 504893 ||  || — || October 30, 2010 || Kitt Peak || Spacewatch ||  || align=right data-sort-value="0.83" | 830 m || 
|-id=894 bgcolor=#fefefe
| 504894 ||  || — || November 27, 2010 || Catalina || CSS ||  || align=right | 1.5 km || 
|-id=895 bgcolor=#fefefe
| 504895 ||  || — || October 14, 2010 || Mount Lemmon || Mount Lemmon Survey ||  || align=right data-sort-value="0.72" | 720 m || 
|-id=896 bgcolor=#fefefe
| 504896 ||  || — || October 11, 2010 || Catalina || CSS ||  || align=right data-sort-value="0.81" | 810 m || 
|-id=897 bgcolor=#fefefe
| 504897 ||  || — || November 8, 2010 || Mount Lemmon || Mount Lemmon Survey ||  || align=right data-sort-value="0.67" | 670 m || 
|-id=898 bgcolor=#d6d6d6
| 504898 ||  || — || November 11, 2010 || Mount Lemmon || Mount Lemmon Survey ||  || align=right | 2.8 km || 
|-id=899 bgcolor=#fefefe
| 504899 ||  || — || January 2, 2011 || Catalina || CSS ||  || align=right data-sort-value="0.75" | 750 m || 
|-id=900 bgcolor=#fefefe
| 504900 ||  || — || November 20, 2006 || Kitt Peak || Spacewatch || NYS || align=right data-sort-value="0.49" | 490 m || 
|}

504901–505000 

|-bgcolor=#FA8072
| 504901 ||  || — || December 5, 1999 || Kitt Peak || Spacewatch ||  || align=right data-sort-value="0.92" | 920 m || 
|-id=902 bgcolor=#fefefe
| 504902 ||  || — || April 29, 2008 || Mount Lemmon || Mount Lemmon Survey ||  || align=right data-sort-value="0.65" | 650 m || 
|-id=903 bgcolor=#fefefe
| 504903 ||  || — || November 26, 2003 || Kitt Peak || Spacewatch ||  || align=right data-sort-value="0.51" | 510 m || 
|-id=904 bgcolor=#fefefe
| 504904 ||  || — || October 17, 2006 || Catalina || CSS ||  || align=right data-sort-value="0.66" | 660 m || 
|-id=905 bgcolor=#d6d6d6
| 504905 ||  || — || October 11, 2009 || Mount Lemmon || Mount Lemmon Survey || SHU3:2 || align=right | 4.9 km || 
|-id=906 bgcolor=#fefefe
| 504906 ||  || — || December 13, 2006 || Kitt Peak || Spacewatch ||  || align=right data-sort-value="0.73" | 730 m || 
|-id=907 bgcolor=#fefefe
| 504907 ||  || — || January 11, 2011 || Kitt Peak || Spacewatch ||  || align=right data-sort-value="0.80" | 800 m || 
|-id=908 bgcolor=#fefefe
| 504908 ||  || — || November 15, 2006 || Kitt Peak || Spacewatch ||  || align=right data-sort-value="0.48" | 480 m || 
|-id=909 bgcolor=#fefefe
| 504909 ||  || — || December 5, 2010 || Mount Lemmon || Mount Lemmon Survey ||  || align=right data-sort-value="0.71" | 710 m || 
|-id=910 bgcolor=#fefefe
| 504910 ||  || — || November 23, 2006 || Kitt Peak || Spacewatch ||  || align=right data-sort-value="0.67" | 670 m || 
|-id=911 bgcolor=#fefefe
| 504911 ||  || — || November 1, 2006 || Kitt Peak || Spacewatch ||  || align=right data-sort-value="0.53" | 530 m || 
|-id=912 bgcolor=#fefefe
| 504912 ||  || — || December 5, 2010 || Mount Lemmon || Mount Lemmon Survey || MAS || align=right data-sort-value="0.67" | 670 m || 
|-id=913 bgcolor=#fefefe
| 504913 ||  || — || January 11, 2011 || Kitt Peak || Spacewatch ||  || align=right | 1.0 km || 
|-id=914 bgcolor=#E9E9E9
| 504914 ||  || — || March 13, 2007 || Catalina || CSS ||  || align=right | 1.6 km || 
|-id=915 bgcolor=#fefefe
| 504915 ||  || — || December 16, 2006 || Kitt Peak || Spacewatch ||  || align=right data-sort-value="0.62" | 620 m || 
|-id=916 bgcolor=#fefefe
| 504916 ||  || — || December 8, 2010 || Mount Lemmon || Mount Lemmon Survey ||  || align=right data-sort-value="0.57" | 570 m || 
|-id=917 bgcolor=#fefefe
| 504917 ||  || — || January 28, 2011 || Kitt Peak || Spacewatch ||  || align=right data-sort-value="0.72" | 720 m || 
|-id=918 bgcolor=#fefefe
| 504918 ||  || — || November 19, 2006 || Kitt Peak || Spacewatch ||  || align=right data-sort-value="0.54" | 540 m || 
|-id=919 bgcolor=#fefefe
| 504919 ||  || — || January 30, 2011 || Kitt Peak || Spacewatch ||  || align=right data-sort-value="0.78" | 780 m || 
|-id=920 bgcolor=#E9E9E9
| 504920 ||  || — || February 6, 2010 || WISE || WISE ||  || align=right | 2.4 km || 
|-id=921 bgcolor=#E9E9E9
| 504921 ||  || — || January 30, 2011 || Haleakala || Pan-STARRS ||  || align=right | 1.7 km || 
|-id=922 bgcolor=#fefefe
| 504922 ||  || — || January 30, 2011 || Haleakala || Pan-STARRS ||  || align=right data-sort-value="0.96" | 960 m || 
|-id=923 bgcolor=#E9E9E9
| 504923 ||  || — || January 30, 2011 || Haleakala || Pan-STARRS || RAF || align=right data-sort-value="0.81" | 810 m || 
|-id=924 bgcolor=#fefefe
| 504924 ||  || — || January 30, 2011 || Haleakala || Pan-STARRS ||  || align=right | 1.0 km || 
|-id=925 bgcolor=#E9E9E9
| 504925 ||  || — || December 10, 2010 || Mount Lemmon || Mount Lemmon Survey ||  || align=right | 1.5 km || 
|-id=926 bgcolor=#fefefe
| 504926 ||  || — || January 3, 2011 || Mount Lemmon || Mount Lemmon Survey ||  || align=right data-sort-value="0.49" | 490 m || 
|-id=927 bgcolor=#fefefe
| 504927 ||  || — || January 10, 2011 || Kitt Peak || Spacewatch ||  || align=right data-sort-value="0.57" | 570 m || 
|-id=928 bgcolor=#FFC2E0
| 504928 ||  || — || February 1, 2011 || Haleakala || Pan-STARRS || AMO || align=right data-sort-value="0.74" | 740 m || 
|-id=929 bgcolor=#fefefe
| 504929 ||  || — || January 26, 2006 || Mount Lemmon || Mount Lemmon Survey || H || align=right data-sort-value="0.63" | 630 m || 
|-id=930 bgcolor=#fefefe
| 504930 ||  || — || December 10, 2010 || Mount Lemmon || Mount Lemmon Survey ||  || align=right data-sort-value="0.64" | 640 m || 
|-id=931 bgcolor=#fefefe
| 504931 ||  || — || January 26, 2011 || Mount Lemmon || Mount Lemmon Survey ||  || align=right data-sort-value="0.78" | 780 m || 
|-id=932 bgcolor=#fefefe
| 504932 ||  || — || January 30, 2011 || Haleakala || Pan-STARRS ||  || align=right data-sort-value="0.74" | 740 m || 
|-id=933 bgcolor=#E9E9E9
| 504933 ||  || — || January 27, 2011 || Kitt Peak || Spacewatch ||  || align=right | 1.2 km || 
|-id=934 bgcolor=#fefefe
| 504934 ||  || — || December 22, 2006 || Kitt Peak || Spacewatch ||  || align=right data-sort-value="0.61" | 610 m || 
|-id=935 bgcolor=#fefefe
| 504935 ||  || — || January 15, 2011 || Mount Lemmon || Mount Lemmon Survey || MAS || align=right data-sort-value="0.52" | 520 m || 
|-id=936 bgcolor=#E9E9E9
| 504936 ||  || — || August 30, 2008 || Socorro || LINEAR ||  || align=right | 1.7 km || 
|-id=937 bgcolor=#fefefe
| 504937 ||  || — || January 26, 2011 || Kitt Peak || Spacewatch || ERI || align=right | 1.4 km || 
|-id=938 bgcolor=#E9E9E9
| 504938 ||  || — || February 11, 2011 || Catalina || CSS ||  || align=right | 2.8 km || 
|-id=939 bgcolor=#fefefe
| 504939 ||  || — || December 24, 2006 || Kitt Peak || Spacewatch ||  || align=right data-sort-value="0.62" | 620 m || 
|-id=940 bgcolor=#E9E9E9
| 504940 ||  || — || January 27, 2011 || Kitt Peak || Spacewatch ||  || align=right data-sort-value="0.89" | 890 m || 
|-id=941 bgcolor=#fefefe
| 504941 ||  || — || January 21, 2006 || Mount Lemmon || Mount Lemmon Survey || H || align=right data-sort-value="0.48" | 480 m || 
|-id=942 bgcolor=#fefefe
| 504942 ||  || — || February 4, 2011 || Catalina || CSS ||  || align=right | 1.1 km || 
|-id=943 bgcolor=#fefefe
| 504943 ||  || — || February 27, 2006 || Kitt Peak || Spacewatch || H || align=right data-sort-value="0.43" | 430 m || 
|-id=944 bgcolor=#E9E9E9
| 504944 ||  || — || February 8, 2011 || Mount Lemmon || Mount Lemmon Survey ||  || align=right data-sort-value="0.98" | 980 m || 
|-id=945 bgcolor=#fefefe
| 504945 ||  || — || February 26, 2011 || Kitt Peak || Spacewatch || H || align=right data-sort-value="0.51" | 510 m || 
|-id=946 bgcolor=#fefefe
| 504946 ||  || — || January 30, 2011 || Haleakala || Pan-STARRS || MAS || align=right data-sort-value="0.69" | 690 m || 
|-id=947 bgcolor=#E9E9E9
| 504947 ||  || — || March 26, 2007 || Mount Lemmon || Mount Lemmon Survey ||  || align=right | 1.2 km || 
|-id=948 bgcolor=#E9E9E9
| 504948 ||  || — || February 25, 2011 || Kitt Peak || Spacewatch ||  || align=right | 2.0 km || 
|-id=949 bgcolor=#d6d6d6
| 504949 ||  || — || March 12, 2011 || Mount Lemmon || Mount Lemmon Survey ||  || align=right | 3.2 km || 
|-id=950 bgcolor=#E9E9E9
| 504950 ||  || — || February 8, 2011 || Mount Lemmon || Mount Lemmon Survey ||  || align=right | 1.2 km || 
|-id=951 bgcolor=#fefefe
| 504951 ||  || — || December 14, 2010 || Mount Lemmon || Mount Lemmon Survey ||  || align=right data-sort-value="0.80" | 800 m || 
|-id=952 bgcolor=#E9E9E9
| 504952 ||  || — || March 9, 2007 || Kitt Peak || Spacewatch || EUN || align=right | 1.2 km || 
|-id=953 bgcolor=#fefefe
| 504953 ||  || — || March 28, 2011 || Mount Lemmon || Mount Lemmon Survey ||  || align=right | 1.0 km || 
|-id=954 bgcolor=#E9E9E9
| 504954 ||  || — || April 30, 2003 || Kitt Peak || Spacewatch ||  || align=right | 1.8 km || 
|-id=955 bgcolor=#E9E9E9
| 504955 ||  || — || June 10, 2007 || Kitt Peak || Spacewatch ||  || align=right | 1.4 km || 
|-id=956 bgcolor=#E9E9E9
| 504956 ||  || — || March 30, 2011 || Mount Lemmon || Mount Lemmon Survey ||  || align=right data-sort-value="0.79" | 790 m || 
|-id=957 bgcolor=#E9E9E9
| 504957 ||  || — || September 23, 2004 || Kitt Peak || Spacewatch ||  || align=right | 1.2 km || 
|-id=958 bgcolor=#fefefe
| 504958 ||  || — || March 31, 2011 || Haleakala || Pan-STARRS || H || align=right data-sort-value="0.65" | 650 m || 
|-id=959 bgcolor=#E9E9E9
| 504959 ||  || — || March 26, 2007 || Mount Lemmon || Mount Lemmon Survey ||  || align=right | 1.8 km || 
|-id=960 bgcolor=#E9E9E9
| 504960 ||  || — || March 26, 2003 || Campo Imperatore || CINEOS || KON || align=right | 2.0 km || 
|-id=961 bgcolor=#E9E9E9
| 504961 ||  || — || March 6, 2011 || Mount Lemmon || Mount Lemmon Survey ||  || align=right | 1.3 km || 
|-id=962 bgcolor=#E9E9E9
| 504962 ||  || — || March 11, 2011 || Kitt Peak || Spacewatch || MAR || align=right data-sort-value="0.93" | 930 m || 
|-id=963 bgcolor=#E9E9E9
| 504963 ||  || — || November 4, 1996 || Kitt Peak || Spacewatch ||  || align=right | 1.3 km || 
|-id=964 bgcolor=#E9E9E9
| 504964 ||  || — || November 18, 2009 || Kitt Peak || Spacewatch ||  || align=right data-sort-value="0.87" | 870 m || 
|-id=965 bgcolor=#fefefe
| 504965 ||  || — || September 12, 2005 || Kitt Peak || Spacewatch ||  || align=right data-sort-value="0.85" | 850 m || 
|-id=966 bgcolor=#fefefe
| 504966 ||  || — || October 17, 2001 || Socorro || LINEAR || H || align=right data-sort-value="0.63" | 630 m || 
|-id=967 bgcolor=#fefefe
| 504967 ||  || — || September 28, 2009 || Mount Lemmon || Mount Lemmon Survey ||  || align=right data-sort-value="0.89" | 890 m || 
|-id=968 bgcolor=#FA8072
| 504968 ||  || — || March 25, 2011 || Kitt Peak || Spacewatch || H || align=right data-sort-value="0.49" | 490 m || 
|-id=969 bgcolor=#E9E9E9
| 504969 ||  || — || April 1, 2011 || Mount Lemmon || Mount Lemmon Survey ||  || align=right data-sort-value="0.89" | 890 m || 
|-id=970 bgcolor=#E9E9E9
| 504970 ||  || — || March 24, 2011 || Kitt Peak || Spacewatch ||  || align=right | 1.00 km || 
|-id=971 bgcolor=#E9E9E9
| 504971 ||  || — || April 1, 2011 || Kitt Peak || Spacewatch ||  || align=right | 2.0 km || 
|-id=972 bgcolor=#E9E9E9
| 504972 ||  || — || May 10, 2007 || Kitt Peak || Spacewatch ||  || align=right | 1.3 km || 
|-id=973 bgcolor=#E9E9E9
| 504973 ||  || — || March 2, 2011 || Kitt Peak || Spacewatch ||  || align=right | 1.3 km || 
|-id=974 bgcolor=#E9E9E9
| 504974 ||  || — || November 8, 2008 || Kitt Peak || Spacewatch ||  || align=right | 3.0 km || 
|-id=975 bgcolor=#FA8072
| 504975 ||  || — || April 15, 2011 || Haleakala || Pan-STARRS || H || align=right data-sort-value="0.79" | 790 m || 
|-id=976 bgcolor=#fefefe
| 504976 ||  || — || March 5, 2008 || Mount Lemmon || Mount Lemmon Survey || H || align=right data-sort-value="0.62" | 620 m || 
|-id=977 bgcolor=#E9E9E9
| 504977 ||  || — || March 1, 2011 || Mount Lemmon || Mount Lemmon Survey ||  || align=right | 1.3 km || 
|-id=978 bgcolor=#E9E9E9
| 504978 ||  || — || March 26, 2011 || Kitt Peak || Spacewatch ||  || align=right | 1.8 km || 
|-id=979 bgcolor=#fefefe
| 504979 ||  || — || April 12, 2011 || Mount Lemmon || Mount Lemmon Survey || H || align=right data-sort-value="0.62" | 620 m || 
|-id=980 bgcolor=#E9E9E9
| 504980 ||  || — || April 6, 2011 || Mount Lemmon || Mount Lemmon Survey ||  || align=right | 1.7 km || 
|-id=981 bgcolor=#E9E9E9
| 504981 ||  || — || March 27, 2011 || Kitt Peak || Spacewatch ||  || align=right | 2.2 km || 
|-id=982 bgcolor=#E9E9E9
| 504982 ||  || — || April 6, 2011 || Mount Lemmon || Mount Lemmon Survey ||  || align=right | 1.3 km || 
|-id=983 bgcolor=#fefefe
| 504983 ||  || — || April 13, 2011 || Catalina || CSS || H || align=right data-sort-value="0.70" | 700 m || 
|-id=984 bgcolor=#E9E9E9
| 504984 ||  || — || January 11, 2010 || Mount Lemmon || Mount Lemmon Survey || EUN || align=right | 1.1 km || 
|-id=985 bgcolor=#E9E9E9
| 504985 ||  || — || April 6, 2011 || Kitt Peak || Spacewatch ||  || align=right | 1.7 km || 
|-id=986 bgcolor=#E9E9E9
| 504986 ||  || — || April 26, 2011 || Kitt Peak || Spacewatch ||  || align=right | 2.6 km || 
|-id=987 bgcolor=#E9E9E9
| 504987 ||  || — || April 28, 2011 || Haleakala || Pan-STARRS ||  || align=right data-sort-value="0.86" | 860 m || 
|-id=988 bgcolor=#E9E9E9
| 504988 ||  || — || April 28, 2011 || Haleakala || Pan-STARRS ||  || align=right | 1.5 km || 
|-id=989 bgcolor=#E9E9E9
| 504989 ||  || — || April 28, 2011 || Haleakala || Pan-STARRS || EUN || align=right | 1.4 km || 
|-id=990 bgcolor=#E9E9E9
| 504990 ||  || — || April 28, 2011 || Haleakala || Pan-STARRS ||  || align=right | 2.2 km || 
|-id=991 bgcolor=#E9E9E9
| 504991 ||  || — || August 12, 2007 || Siding Spring || SSS ||  || align=right | 2.6 km || 
|-id=992 bgcolor=#E9E9E9
| 504992 ||  || — || November 16, 2009 || Mount Lemmon || Mount Lemmon Survey ||  || align=right | 1.2 km || 
|-id=993 bgcolor=#E9E9E9
| 504993 ||  || — || April 28, 2011 || Haleakala || Pan-STARRS ||  || align=right | 2.5 km || 
|-id=994 bgcolor=#FFC2E0
| 504994 ||  || — || May 3, 2011 || Mount Lemmon || Mount Lemmon Survey || AMOcritical || align=right | 1.5 km || 
|-id=995 bgcolor=#E9E9E9
| 504995 ||  || — || April 28, 2011 || Kitt Peak || Spacewatch ||  || align=right | 1.8 km || 
|-id=996 bgcolor=#E9E9E9
| 504996 ||  || — || November 2, 2008 || Mount Lemmon || Mount Lemmon Survey ||  || align=right | 2.0 km || 
|-id=997 bgcolor=#E9E9E9
| 504997 ||  || — || July 15, 2007 || La Sagra || OAM Obs. || JUN || align=right | 1.2 km || 
|-id=998 bgcolor=#E9E9E9
| 504998 ||  || — || February 12, 2011 || Mount Lemmon || Mount Lemmon Survey ||  || align=right | 1.9 km || 
|-id=999 bgcolor=#E9E9E9
| 504999 ||  || — || May 21, 2011 || Mount Lemmon || Mount Lemmon Survey ||  || align=right | 2.1 km || 
|-id=000 bgcolor=#E9E9E9
| 505000 ||  || — || April 19, 2006 || Kitt Peak || Spacewatch ||  || align=right | 2.5 km || 
|}

References

External links 
 Discovery Circumstances: Numbered Minor Planets (500001)–(505000) (IAU Minor Planet Center)

0504